= Olanike =

Olanike is a given name and surname. Notable people with the name include:

- Fagbule Olanike (fl. early 21st century), Nigerian entrepreneur
- Olanike Adeyemo (born 1970), Nigerian professor
- Olanike Olugboji-Daramola (born 1974), Nigerian conservationist
