= Fundamental Rights and Duties in Nepal =

Part III of the Constitution of Nepal

Fundamental rights and duties in Nepal are the basic human rights mentioned in the Part III of Constitution of Nepal for every Nepalese citizen. This allows a Nepalese citizen to live a life with dignity.

Article 16 to Article 46 of the Nepalese constitution guarantees 31 fundamental rights to Nepalese people. These include freedom to live with dignity, freedom of speech and expression, religious and cultural freedom, right against untouchability and discrimination, and others. As per Article 47, for enforcing these rights, the state was required to make legal provisions within three years of the commencement of the constitution. Additionally, Article 48 lists duties of every Nepalese to safeguard the nationality, sovereignty and integrity of Nepal.

== Rights described in constitution ==
1. Right to live with dignity (16)

2. Right to freedom (17)

3. Right to equality (18)

4. Right to communication (19)

5. Right relating to justice (20)

6. Right of a victim of a crime (21)

7. Right against torture (22)

8. Right against preventive detention (23)

9. Right against untouchability and discrimination (24)

10. Right relating to property (25)

11. Right to freedom of religion (26)

12.Right to information (27)

13. Right to privacy (28)

14. Right against exploitation (29)

15. Right to clean environment (30)

16. Right to education (31)

17. Right to language and culture (32)

18. Right to employment (33)

19. Right to labor (34)

20. Right to health (35)

21. Right to food (36)

22. Right to shelter (37)

23. Right of women (38)

24. Right of children (39)

25. Right of Dalits (40)

26. Right of senior citizen (41)

27. Right to social justice (42)

28. Right to social security (43)

29. Right of consumer (44)

30. Right against exile (45)

31. Right to constitutional remedies (46)

== Fundamental Duties ==
According to Article 48 of the Constitution of Nepal, every citizen shall have the following duties:

(a) To safeguard the nationality, sovereignty, and integrity of Nepal, while being loyal to the nation.

(b) To abide by the Constitution and law.

(c) To render compulsory service as and when the State so requires.

(d) To protect and preserve public property.
