= Committee on World Food Security =

UN intergovernmental body

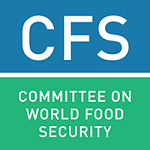
Logo of the Committee on World Food Security (CFS) of the United Nations

The Committee on World Food Security (CFS) is an intergovernmental body within the United Nations System.

== History ==
The Committee on World Food Security (CFS) was established in 1974 as an intergovernmental body to serve as a forum in the United Nations System for review and follow-up of policies concerning world food security, including any and all production, physical, and economic access to food.

It was reformed in 2009 to become a multi-stakeholder committee.

Stockholm International Peace Research Institute constitutes a key role in achieving the UN's Sustainable Development Goal (SDG) No.2.

== Aims and functions ==
The Committee on World Food Security's tasks are to:

- Coordinate a global approach to food security
- Promote policy convergence
- Support and advise countries and regions
- Coordinate at national and regional levels
- Promote accountability and share best practices
- Develop a global strategic framework for food security and nutrition

== Structure and governance ==
=== The Secretariat ===
The CFS has a permanent Secretariat located in the Food and Agriculture Organization of the United Nations (FAO), headquartered in Rome, Italy, which includes members from the World Food Programme (WFP) and the International Fund for Agricultural Development (IFAD). Its task is to support the Plenary, the Bureau and Advisory Group and the HLPE-FSN in their work.

The annual Plenary session is the forum for debate, decision-taking, coordination, and convergence by all stakeholders at a global level.

=== The CFS Bureau and Advisory Group ===
The CFS Bureau is the executive division of the CFS. It is made up of a chairperson and 12 member countries. In 2023, Nosipho Nausca-Jean Jezile, Ambassador of the Republic of South Africa to the FAO and the other Rome-based UN agencies, was elected chair, replacing Gabriel Ferrero from Spain, who had been chair for the previous two years.

The Advisory Group comprises five categories:

1. UN agencies and bodies and the Special Rapporteur on the Right to Food
2. Civil Society and Indigenous Peoples' Mechanism (CSIPM)
3. International centres of agricultural research
4. International and regional financial institutions, including the World Bank, the International Monetary Fund, the World Trade Organization, and banks focused on regional development
5. Private sector mechanism

The CSIPM was established in 2010, for the purpose of facilitating participation by civil society, which in turn informs the policy processes of the CFS. There are no formal members, just participating organizations that work in the area of food security and nutrition, particularly those representing marginalized groups such as smallholder family farmers, herders, landless, Indigenous peoples. Several hundred national, regional, and global organizations have participated in the CSIPM. As of April 2024 the 11 constituencies of the CSIPM are: Smallholders Farmers, Pastoralists/Herders, Fisherfolk, Indigenous Peoples, Consumers, Urban Food Insecure, Agricultural and Food Workers, Women, Youth, Landless, and NGOs. The governing body is the Coordination Committee, made up of 22 members from 11 constituencies and 17 sub-regions.

=== The High Level Panel of Experts on Food Security and Nutrition ===
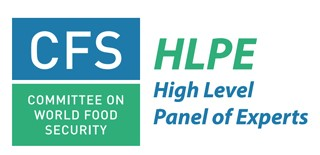

The High Level Panel of Experts on Food Security and Nutrition (HLPE-FSN) is an independent body founded in 2009 to provide scientific knowledge-based analysis and recommendations. It comprises a steering committee and a roster of experts who work in teams on specific projects.

The HLPE-FSN working processes ensure "legitimacy among stakeholders and a high degree of scientific quality": they involve broad stakeholder consultations and the incorporation of different forms of knowledge and expertise, as well as a rigorous scientific peer-review process.

The HLPE-FSN has published many reports, including:

1. Price volatility and food security (2011)
2. Land tenure and international investments in agriculture (2011)
3. Food security and climate change (2012)
4. Social protection for food security (2012)
5. Biofuels and food security (2013)
6. Investing in smallholder agriculture for food security (2013)
7. Sustainable fisheries and aquaculture for food security and nutrition (2014)
8. Food losses and waste in the context of sustainable food systems (2014)
9. Water for food security and nutrition (2015)
10. Sustainable agricultural development for food security and nutrition: what roles for livestock? (2016)
11. Sustainable forestry for food security and nutrition (2017)
12. Nutrition and food systems (2017)
13. Multi-stakeholder partnerships to finance and improve food security and nutrition in the framework of the 2030 Agenda (2018)
14. Agroecological and other innovative approaches for sustainable agriculture and food systems that enhance food security and nutrition (2019)
15. Food security and nutrition: building a global narrative towards 2030 (2020)
16. Promoting youth engagement and employment in agriculture and food systems (2021)
17. Data collection and analysis tools for food security and nutrition: towards enhancing effective, inclusive, evidence-informed, decision making (2022)
18. Reducing inequalities for food security and nutrition (2023)

As of June 2024 the chair of HLPE-FSN is Akiko Suwa-Eisenmann, and Iain Wright, is vice-chair. Steering Committee members include Olanike Adeyemo, Hilal Elver, Patrick Webb, and Cecilia Elizondo.

== Criticism ==
Besides the CFS there are the FAO, the International Fund for Agricultural Development (IFAD), and World Food Programme (WFP), as well as the UN Food Systems Coordination Hub, all based in Rome, working on global food security, international coordination and achievement of the 17 SDGs, with parallel structures causing unclear responsibilities and inefficient structures.

A 2023 article published on Devex, based on interviews with CFS stakeholders, found some respondents felt that giving organisations with contradictory goals, namely right to food, human rights and companies interests a common table inside the CFS was the cause of a lack of results of CFS policies.
