= Daramola =

- Gender: Male
- Language: Yoruba

Origin
- Origin: Nigeria
- Meaning: One who has achieved personal goodness along with wealth
- Region of origin: South West, Nigeria

Dáramọ́lá is a Nigerian surname. It is a male name and of Yoruba origin, which means "One who has achieved personal goodness along with wealth.". The diminutive form is Dára.

== Notable individuals with the name ==
- Bimbo Daramola (born 1967), Nigerian scientist and politician.
- Foluke Daramola (born 1978), Nigerian actress.
- Olanike Olugboji-Daramola (born 1974), Nigerian conservationist, environmental rights advocate.
- Adebiyi Daramola (1958 – 2022), Nigerian academic and professor.
