= Universal Declaration on the Eradication of Hunger and Malnutrition =

- Signed: 16 November 1974
- Location: Rome, Italy

Full text
- Universal Declaration on the Eradication of Hunger and Malnutrition at Wikisource

The Universal Declaration on the Eradication of Hunger and Malnutrition was adopted on 16 November 1974, by governments who attended the 1974 World Food Conference that was convened under General Assembly resolution 3180 (XXVIII) of 17 December 1973. It was later endorsed by General Assembly resolution 3348 (XXIX), of 17 December 1974. This Declaration combined discussions of the international human right to adequate food and nutrition with an acknowledgement of the various economic and political issues that can affect the production and distribution of food related products. Within this Declaration, it is recognised that it is the common purpose of all nations to work together towards eliminating hunger and malnutrition. Further, the Declaration explains how the welfare of much of the world's population depends on their ability to adequately produce and distribute food. In doing so, it emphasises the need for the international community to develop a more adequate system to ensure that the right to food for all persons is recognised. The opening paragraph of the Declaration, which remains to be the most recited paragraph of the Declaration today, reads:

Every man, woman and child has the inalienable right to be free from hunger and malnutrition in order to develop fully and maintain their physical and mental faculties.

The Universal Declaration on the Eradication of Hunger and Malnutrition affirmed that it is a fundamental human right to be free from hunger and malnutrition, so that one can develop both their mental and physical faculties fully. This Declaration arose out of ever-growing concerns regarding worldwide famine, and in doing so, stressed that every country that is in a position to be able to assist developing nations to gain access to more, better quality food, has the responsibility to ensure that this right to food is realized.

== History ==
=== Precursors ===
The prevalence of hunger and malnutrition is an issue that has long been of international concern. Although it has been accepted that obtaining exact statistics regarding world hunger is difficult, it is believed that in the early 1960s, there were approximately 900 million undernourished individuals worldwide. The majority of these individuals were located in developing nations such as Africa, Asia and Latin America. It is believed that today, one in every nine individuals do not have an adequate access to food. Hunger and malnutrition have now been identified as the cause of more deaths worldwide than AIDS, malaria and tuberculosis combined. Today it is estimated that there are approximately 1.02 billion people across the world living in conditions of extreme hunger, 1 billion of whom live in developing countries. Hunger and malnutrition have been of growing concern throughout the international community, despite a number of intervention attempts from the likes of States and non-government organisations. The right to food, for example, was asserted in the 1948 Universal Declaration of Human Rights (UDHR), and was again recognised in 1966 through Article 11 of the International Covenant on Economic, Social and Cultural Rights.

Leading up to the drafting and formation of the Universal Declaration on the Eradication of Hunger and Malnutrition, the international community as a whole was becoming increasingly aware of the severity of the worldwide issue of hunger and malnutrition, and identified an immediate need for some form of action to combat this. This growing concern was an important factor leading to the first World Food Conference convening in Rome in 1974 in an attempt to uncover an adequate solution in order to combat this issue.

=== Adoption ===
Representatives from 135 countries attended the 1974 World Food Conference where this Declaration was adopted. As well as these State representatives, a number of libertarian movements, United Nations bodies and intergovernmental organisations were also present at this Conference. Representatives from the following countries were present for the formation of the Universal Declaration on the Eradication of Hunger and Malnutrition:

- Afghanistan
- Albania
- Algeria
- Argentina
- Australia
- Austria
- Bahamas
- Bahrain
- Bangladesh
- Barbados
- Belgium
- Bhutan
- Bolivia
- Botswana
- Brazil
- Bulgaria
- Burma
- Burundi
- Byelorussian Soviet Socialist Republic
- Canada
- Central African Republic
- Chad
- Chile
- China
- Colombia
- Congo
- Costa Rica
- Cuba
- Czechoslovakia
- Dahomey
- Democratic Yemen
- Denmark
- Dominican Republic
- Ecuador
- Egypt
- El Salvador
- Ethiopia
- Finland
- France
- Gabon
- Gambia
- German Democratic Republic
- Germany
- Ghana
- Greece
- Guatemala
- Guinea
- Guyana
- Holy See
- Honduras
- Hungary
- Iceland
- India
- Indonesia
- Iran
- Iraq
- Ireland
- Israel
- Italy
- Ivory Coast
- Jamaica
- Japan
- Jordan
- Kenya
- Khmer Republic
- Kuwait
- Lebanon
- Lesotho
- Liberia
- Libyan Arab Republic
- Luxembourg
- Madagascar
- Malawi
- Malaysia
- Maldives
- Mali
- Malta
- Mauritania
- Mauritius
- Mexico
- Mongolia
- Morocco
- Nepal
- Netherlands
- New Zealand
- Nicaragua
- Niger
- Nigeria
- Norway
- Oman
- Pakistan
- Panama
- Paraguay
- Peru
- Philippines
- Poland
- Portugal
- Qatar
- Republic of Korea
- Republic of Viet Nam
- Romania
- Rwanda
- Saudi Arabia
- Senegal
- Sierra Leone
- Somalia
- Spain
- Sri Lanka
- Sudan
- Swaziland
- Sweden
- Switzerland
- Syrian Arab Republic
- Thailand
- Togo
- Trinidad and Tobago
- Tunisia
- Turkey
- Uganda
- Ukrainian Soviet Socialist Republic
- Union of Soviet Socialist Republics
- United Arab Emirates
- United Kingdom
- United Republic of Cameroon
- United Republic of Tanzania
- United States of America
- Upper Volta
- Uruguay
- Venezuela
- Yemen (Sana'a)
- SFR Yugoslavia
- Zaire
- Zambia

== Structure ==
The Declaration in itself is 12 paragraphs. Many of these paragraphs have now been elaborated on in subsequent international human rights treaties and regional human rights instruments. Throughout these paragraphs, the intended purposes, functions and goals of this Declaration are set out. A number of these paragraphs are worth further consideration.

- Paragraph A) brings attention to the grave nature of the international food crisis, and highlights the vast imbalance between the resources found in developing countries and those found in developed countries.
- Paragraph C) recognises that this international food crises arose from various historical circumstances, such as colonisation and racial discrimination.
- Paragraph D) expands on this point about historical circumstances and discusses how recent international economic crises have worked to further prolong and aggravate this problem.
- Paragraph F) recognises that all countries, regardless of their size, population or economic status must be considered equal.
- Paragraph I) identifies that any lasting solution to this food crises is also going to need to attempt to decrease the ever-growing gap between developed and developing countries, in order to bring about a “new international economic order."
- Paragraph K) of the Declaration recognises that developing countries are not always able to meet the food requirements of their people of their own merits, and therefore acknowledges that urgent and effective action needs to be taken by the international community, and this should be free from political pressures.

== Purpose ==
The Declaration itself identifies that the key purpose in its adoption was to develop more adequate means for the international community as a whole, to take action to resolve the world hunger problem. It was further outlined that this Declaration was adopted to encourage and further develop international economic co-operation. Ultimately, this Declaration sought to develop a series of ways that the international community in its entirety, could work towards combatting, and ultimately overcoming, the growing issue of hunger and malnutrition. This Declaration highlighted the urgency of attending to this matter and called for rapid and sustained action to bring an end to this menacing problem of world hunger. Another crucial reason underlying the adoption of this Declaration was the need to remind the world's population that freedom from hunger, and the right to food, is an inalienable human right that needs to be protected. It also sought to remind the world that the access to adequate food is an essential factor in the full development of an individual's physical and mental faculties.

== Significance and Legal Effect ==
The following resolutions were adopted to attempt to fulfil the purpose of this Declaration:

- Resolution I : Objectives and strategies of food production.
- Resolution II : Priorities for agricultural and rural development.
- Resolution III : Fertilizers
- Resolution IV : Food and agricultural research, extension and training.
- Resolution V : Policies and programmes to improve nutrition.
- Resolution VI : World soil charter and land capability assessment.
- Resolution VII : Scientific water management: irrigation, drainage and flood control.
- Resolution VIII : Women and food.
- Resolution IX : Achievement of a desirable balance between population and food supply.
- Resolution X : Pesticides.
- Resolution XI : Programme for the control of African animal trypanosomiasis.
- Resolution XII : Seed industry development.
- Resolution XIII : International Fund for Agriculture Development.
- Resolution XIV : Reduction of military expenditures for the purpose of increasing food production.
- Resolution XV : Food aid to victims of colonial wars in Africa.
- Resolution XVI : Global Information and Early Warning System on Food and Agriculture.
- Resolution XVII : International Undertaking on World Food Security.
- Resolution XVIII : An improved policy for food aid.
- Resolution XIX : International trade, stabilization and agricultural adjustment.
- Resolution XX : Arrangements for follow-up action, including appropriate operational machinery on recommendations or resolutions of the Conference.

In 2014, the Food and Agriculture Organization of the United Nations recognised that the Universal Declaration on the Eradication of Hunger and Malnutrition was one of the key non-binding human rights instruments in relation to the right to food. A non-binding international instrument such as this Declaration outlines the guidelines and principles, imposing moral, but not legal, obligations on party states. The United Nations, in its description of the purpose of a Declaration, stated that the intention here is not to create binding obligations to be enforced on states, but rather to declare certain aspirations. Although states whom are party to a Declaration of this kind are not legally bound, non-binding Declarations are well accepted to be crucial in the development of international human rights law.

This Declaration has been crucial in the growing knowledge, support and aid of food and agriculture to developing nations. Research has identified that the number of people across the world who are chronically malnourished has decreased by 167 million over the past decade. However, in 1996 the World Food Summit called for the need for a 50% reduction in the number of malnourished people by the year 2015 – a goal that was not achieved. Because of this, a number of human rights advocates such as the United Nations and the World Food Summit have since been calling for further action in the attempt to end this crisis. These organisations now believe that the best way to bring an end to this crisis is through the implementation of enforceable international laws that guarantee the right for people to be free from hunger. Such organisations believe that the international community needs to create some enforceable legal document such as an International Food Security Treaty that ensures the right to food is recognised, and imposes obligations on countries to develop their own national law on the issue.

== See also ==
- Right to food
