= International Food Security Treaty =

Humanitarian Treaty

The International Food Security Treaty (IFST) is a proposed covenant between nations aiming to place the human right of freedom from hunger under the protection of enforceable national and international laws.

== History ==
=== Evolution of the Human Right to Freedom from Hunger ===
The concept of freedom from hunger, also known as the right to food, was indirectly referenced in President Franklin D. Roosevelt's 1941 State of the Union speech as one of the four fundamental freedoms inherent to all people worldwide, known as Freedom From Want.

The right to food was further addressed by the United Nations, as stated by United States Congressman Tony P. Hall, who highlighted that it was recognized in the Universal Declaration of Human Rights, a proclamation by the UN in 1948, and reinforced by the 1966 International Covenant on Economic, Social and Cultural Rights.

The Universal Declaration of Human Rights, adopted without a dissenting vote, explicitly stated in Article 25 that "Everyone has the right to a standard of living adequate for the health and well-being of himself and his family, including food..."

The right to freedom from hunger was the sole human right described as "fundamental" in the International Covenant on Economic, Social, and Cultural Rights, which more than 170 nations have signed as of early 2023. Article 11 of the covenant establishes states' legal responsibility to recognize the right "of everyone to an adequate standard of living for himself and his family, including adequate food...and to recognize the fundamental right of everyone to be free from hunger."

However, neither the International Covenant on Economic, Social, and Cultural Rights nor the Universal Declaration of Human Rights provides guidance on how the right to freedom from hunger can be protected by enforceable law. In response to this gap, the International Food Security Treaty (IFST) Campaign was initiated in 1993, proposing four principles to be incorporated into enforceable national and international laws.

In 1996, the North American Right to Food Working Group, consisting of international lawyers and various non-governmental organizations in the US and Canada including the IFST Campaign, was formed to draft the IFST Principles into treaty form. The IFST Campaign participated in the Non-Governmental Organization Forum at the World Food Summit in Rome in November of that year.

In 2002, the International Food Security Treaty Association was established as a sister organization to the International Food Security Treaty Campaign, and in 2010, both organizations received non-profit status designations from the United States Internal Revenue Service as 501c(3) and 501c(4) respectively.

== Treaty Presentations ==
Starting in 2000, the International Food Security Treaty (IFST) Campaign, led by its founding director John Teton, began a series of presentations to raise awareness about the IFST. One of the notable appearances was sponsored by Harvard Law School's Human Rights Program, where Dr. Marc Cohen, a recognized expert on world hunger, also joined the presentation.

Since then, the IFST has been presented at various prestigious venues, including law schools such as Yale, the University of California campuses at Los Angeles and Berkeley, and the University of Washington. It has also been presented at the public health programs at Johns Hopkins University and New York University, as well as at five briefings on Capitol Hill in Washington, D.C. The IFST was featured as an official side-event to the 2015 United Nations' Committee on World Food Security annual plenary session, sponsored by the Right to Food Team at the UN's Food and Agriculture Organization. In 2023, Teton gave the keynote address on the IFST at the World Food Day event at the Harvard School of Public Health.

== Treaty Principles ==
The International Food Security Treaty (IFST) is a proposed international commitment to fulfill the human right to freedom from hunger and protect it through enforceable law. The draft Treaty, which is approximately 700 words in length, can be reviewed on the IFST website[i].In keeping with obligations inherent in the International Bill of Rights, each signatory nation commits itself to:

1) provide access to a minimum standard of nutrition recognized by the United Nations to all people within its borders unable to gain such access on their own; 2) contribute to a World Food Reserve and Resource Center as it is able, to assist any nation needing emergency help to provide such access; 3) establish and enforce a law prohibiting activities denying or intending to deny the minimum standard of nutrition to any person within its borders; and 4) support United Nations food security enforcement actions in nations whose governments are unable to enforce such law on their own, or who are found unwilling to do so through formal United Nations investigations.

In addition, the IFST adopts the reporting and optional protocol process for implementing and enforcing the right to food, which is currently used under the International Covenant on Civil and Political Rights (ICCPR)

[iv] and its Optional Protocol.

== Endorsements ==
The International Food Security Treaty (IFST) has received endorsements and support from various prominent figures in the fields of international law, human rights, hunger expertise, politics, and religion, including:

Maurice Strong, former UN Under-Secretary General, who referred to the IFST as "the centerpiece of a whole system by which the capacity of the earth to feed its people is translated into a real commitment to do something...Initiatives like this—you could equate it to abolishing slavery...need to be championed by small groups of people who have strong (convictions) and are prepared to prevail against a general mood of apathy." [i][ii].

Amartya Sen, Nobel Laureate Economist.

Dianne Feinstein, United States Senator, who has written, "(The IFST) could become a major element in stimulating global action to eradicate starvation and in strengthening the international justice system."

Barbara Lee, US Congresswoman, who has stated "The [IFSTC] is on the vanguard of the effort to end world hunger through rule of law."

John Shattuck, former U.S. Assistant Secretary of State for Democracy, Human Rights and Labor.

Jeff Merkley, Member of the United States Senate.

Richard J. Deckelbaum, MD, Professor of Nutrition and Director of the Institute of Human Nutrition at Columbia University Medical Center.

Robert S. Lawrence, MD, Professor Emeritus at the Johns Hopkins Bloomberg School of Public Health and Founding board member and Past President of Physicians for Human Rights.

The Very Rev. William Lupfer, former Dean of Trinity Episcopal Church in Portland, Oregon, USA.

Frances Moore Lappé, co-founder of the Small Planet Institute and Food First, and winner of the 1987 Right Livelihood Award.

Juan Somavia, former Ambassador from Chile to the UN and Coordinator of the 1995 United Nations World Summit on Social Development.

Hon. David MacDonald, former Canadian Secretary of State and Emergency Coordinator for the African Famine.

Peter Kostmayer, former President of Population Connection.

Dr. Robert Muller, former Chancellor of the United Nations University for Peace and United Nations Assistant Secretary-General.

A letter signed by numerous organizations devoted to eliminating hunger expressing support for the International Food Security Treaty may be found online.[i] .

== The IFST's Enforcement Provision ==
The Rome Declaration from the 1996 United Nations World Food Summit emphasized that "food should not be used as an instrument for political and economic pressure," but failed to address the need for legal enforcement of the human right of freedom from hunger. [i].

Similarly, the United Nations' Right to Food Team's 2004 publication "Voluntary Guidelines to support the Progressive Realization of the Right to Food in the context of national food security" does not mention enforcement[ii].

Despite these United Nations declarations, recent statistics from the World Health Organization in 2022 estimated that as many as 828 million people in the world are hungry[iii], which is roughly equivalent to the number estimated more than a quarter-century earlier at the time of the World Food Summit.

IFST proponents argue that while the percentage of the global population considered hungry has decreased, there's little cause to cheer progress in hunger reduction when the raw numbers of seriously hungry people remains roughly unchanged from what it was more than a quarter-century ago. The lack of progress in substantially reducing the raw number of hungry people over the past quarter-century indicates a failure to enforce UN declarations and international laws related to hunger reduction. They view the non-enforceable declarations as initial steps toward much stronger legislation, much as US President Abraham Lincoln described the statement that "all men are created equal" in the American Declaration of Independence:

They did not mean to assert the obvious untruth, that all were then actually enjoying that equality, nor yet, that they were about to confer it immediately upon them. In fact they had no power to confer such a boon. They meant simply to declare the right, so that the enforcement of it might follow as fast as circumstances should permit...The assertion that "all men are created equal" was of no practical use in effecting our separation from Great Britain; and it was placed in the Declaration, not for that, but for future use.[i]

As a result, the IFST has been designed to complement existing anti-hunger declarations and the Voluntary Guidelines by focusing on a narrower but highly ambitious objective of eliminating malnutrition and starvation through enforceable national and international laws. Proponents of the IFST also see it as a significant contributor to future regional, national, and international stability, aligning with the view expressed by US President Dwight Eisenhower that it is "madness to suppose that there could be an island of tranquility and prosperity in a sea of wretchedness and frustration."[i]

== Critical Questions Regarding the IFST ==
While criticism of the IFST may arise as it progresses, its advocates know that the Treaty, like any proposal for significant changes in law, will encounter questions and criticisms along the way. Several of these have been anticipated and are addressed in an article on the IFST in the Yale Journal of International Affairs[i].

One potential criticism is that the IFST would be too expensive. However, proponents argue that any assessment of the Treaty must consider the economic benefits to the global economy from preventing the long-term impacts of malnutrition on millions of children, including the costs of caring for them and the lost productivity they may experience. Additionally, commitments to the Treaty would ensure that financing its expenses would be shared broadly among many signatories, rather than falling disproportionately on a few countries.

Furthermore, the IFST could spare countries the costs of military interventions that may become necessary due to the use of famine as a weapon. For example, in the 1990s, forces from many countries had to intervene to halt the weaponization of hunger during the Somali Civil War.
