= World Food Conference =

The first World Food Conference was held in Rome in 1974 (5-16 November) by the United Nations under the auspices of the UN Food and Agriculture Organization (FAO), in the wake of the devastating famine in Bangladesh in the preceding two years. The conference was headed by Sayed Marei, an Egyptian agronomist and politician.

Perhaps the most famous statement made at the conference was by then-U.S. Secretary of State Henry Kissinger who set a goal "that within a decade no child will go to bed hungry, that no family will fear for its next day’s bread, and that no human being’s future and capacities will be stunted by malnutrition."

In the Universal Declaration on the Eradication of Hunger and Malnutrition, governments attending the World Food Conference proclaimed that "every man, woman and child has the inalienable right to be free from hunger and malnutrition in order to develop their physical and mental faculties."

Among other outcomes, the conference put in place a World Food Council (subsequently disbanded) and led to follow-up World Food Conferences.

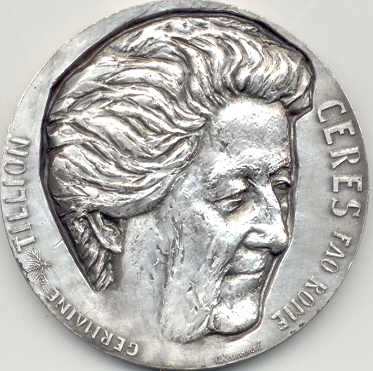
FAO CERES Tillion Silver Obverse

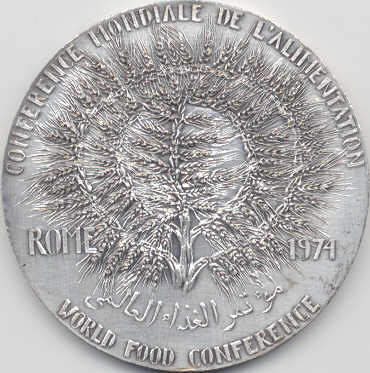
FAO CERES Tillion Silver Reverse

The FAO commemorated this conference with the issue of a CERES Medal featuring Germaine Tillion.

== See also ==
- Right to food
- World Food Summit
