= Right to food by country =

This section provides an overview of the status of the right to food at a national level.

== Right to food in the world ==
Framework law Adopted a framework law (10). Drafting a framework law (9). Constitutional: explicit as right As a separate and stand-alone right (9). Of a specific segment of the population (10). As part of a human right to an adequate standard of living, quality of life, development, or right to work (5). Constitutional: implicit or as directive principle Implicit in broader rights (31). Explicit directive principle (13). Applicable via international law Direct applicability of ICESCR, CEDAW and CRC (95). Direct applicability of ICESCR and CRC (2). Direct applicability of CEDAW and CRC (5). Commitment via ICESCR Ratified the Optional Protocol to the ICESCR (8). Ratified the ICESCR (160). No known right to food. Note: The same country can fall in multiple categories; the colour given to a country corresponds to the highest listed category in which a country falls.

== Country by country ==
=== Argentina ===
Argentina has included the topic of food sovereignty in framework law, though its status is sometimes controversial: Law 25.724 on the National Programme for Food and Nutrition Security, 2003.

=== Bangladesh ===
The right to food is enshrined in the constitution, Article 15 (Provision of basic necessities):

"It shall be a fundamental responsibility of the State to attain, through planned economic growth, a constant increase of productive forces and a steady improvement of the material and cultural standard of living of the people, with a view to securing to its citizens... the provision of the basic necessities of life, including food, clothing, shelter..."

In 2004, the Special Rapporteur leads a country mission to Bangladesh.

=== Benin ===
In 2010, the Special Rapporteur leads a country mission to Benin.

=== Bolivia ===
Bolivia has included the topic of food sovereignty in framework law, though its status is sometimes controversial: Supreme Decree No 28667 of 5 April 2006; Food Law for Workers, 2004.

In 2007, the Special Rapporteur leads a country mission to Bolivia.

=== Brazil ===
The right to food is enshrined in the constitution, Article 227 (Right to food for children and teenagers):

"It is the duty of the family, of society, and of the State to ensure children and adolescents, with absolute priority, the right to life, health, food, education, leisure, professional training, culture, dignity, respect, freedom, and family and community life, in addition to safeguarding them against all forms of negligence, discrimination, exploitation, violence, cruelty, and oppression."

In 2003, the Fome Zero (Zero Hunger) government program is introduced by president Lula da Silva, with the objective to eradicate hunger and extreme poverty in Brazil.

In 2003, the Special Rapporteur leads a country mission to Brazil.

In 2006, Brazil adopts a framework law on the right to food. Brazil has included the topic of food sovereignty in framework law, though its status is sometimes controversial: Law No. 11,346, 2006 Establishing the National Food and Nutrition Security System (SISAN); Decree No. 6273, establishing the Interministerial Chamber for Food and Nutritional Security, 2007.

In 2007, Brazil's National Rapporteur on the Right to Food, Water, and Rural Land files a successful class action on behalf of favela residents.

In 2010, the Brazilian House of Representatives votes a Constitutional amendment on the right to food.

In 2010, the Special Rapporteur leads a country mission to Brazil.

In 2012, the Special Rapporteur, Mr. De Schutter, pointed to the example of Brazil to highlight the effectiveness of multi-year national framework laws on the right to food.

=== Canada ===
In 2012, the Special Rapporteur leads a country mission to Canada and the initial court challenge of R v Hughes (Canadian Right to Food Trial) begins.

R v Hughes (2009) 446 AR 351, (2009) 442 WAC 351 (also known as the Canadian Right to Food Trial) was a court case on the right to food in Calgary, Alberta, Canada. The initial court challenge that was the basis of the case started in March 2012. The decision was under appeal to the Alberta Court of Queen's Bench. The subsequent trial date was 28 June 2013, at the Calgary Courthouse. The case originated from a bylaw charge of possession of chickens in the city laid against Paul Hughes by the City of Calgary in 2009. Possession of chickens was illegal in Calgary as per the Responsible Pet Ownership Bylaw 27. While urban chickens were illegal in Calgary, they were legal in hundreds of other communities in North America and the raising of hens for eggs was an accepted practice in vast numbers of cultures around the world.

=== China ===
In 2012, the Special Rapporteur leads a country mission to China.

=== Colombia ===
The right to food is enshrined in the Colombian constitution, Article 44:

"The following are basic rights for children... a balanced diet..."

=== Congo ===
The right to food is enshrined in the constitution of the Republic of the Congo, Article 34 (Health, Aged, Handicapped):

"The State is the guarantor of public health. Every citizen shall have the right to a level of life sufficient to assure his health, his well-being and that of his family, notably food, clothing, shelter, medical care as well as necessary social services."

=== Cuba ===
The right to food is enshrined in the constitution, Article 8 (The Socialist State):

"...as the power of the people and for the people, guarantees:... That no child be left without schooling, food and clothing."

In 2007, the Special Rapporteur leads a country mission to Cuba.

=== Ecuador ===
The right to food is enshrined in the old constitution, Article 19:

"...The right to a standard of living that ensures the necessary health, food, clothing, housing, medical care and social services."

Ecuador has included the topic of food sovereignty in framework law, though its status is sometimes controversial: Law on Food and Nutritional Security, No. 41, 2006; Law on Food Sovereignty, Official Registry No. 583, 5 May 2009.

In 2008, Ecuador includes the right to food in its Constitution, approved on September 28 by 64% of the population in a referendum. Article 281, titled Food Sovereignty reads: "Food Sovereignty constitutes an objective and strategic obligation from the State to guarantee its people, communities, pueblos and nationalities self sufficiency in healthy food, culturally appropriate in a permanent form."

In 2009, Ecuador develops a Food Sovereignty Framework Law.

=== El Salvador ===
El Salvador approved in 2019 specific legislation to fight hunger and malnutrition through the donation of food. Legislative Decree No. 416 of October, 2019. This legislation establishes the conditions for food donations and authorizes the creation of food banks nationwide to ensure food security. With this, El Salvador became the first country in Central America to approved specific legislation to facilitate access to food through food donations via food banks. Text of the bill can be found at the following link:

https://faolex.fao.org/docs/pdf/els190959.pdf

=== Ethiopia ===
The right to food is enshrined in the constitution, Article 90 (Social objectives):

"To the extent the country's resources permit, policies shall aim to provide all Ethiopians with access to public health and education, clean water, housing, food and social security."

In 2005, the Special Rapporteur leads a country mission to Ethiopia.

=== Guatemala ===
The right to food is enshrined in the constitution, Article 51 (Protection of Minors and the Elderly):

"The State will protect the physical, mental and moral health of Minors and the Elderly. It will guarantee them their right to food, public health, education, security and social insurance."

And Article 99 (Feeding and nutrition):

"The State will see to it that the food and the nutrition of the population meet the minimum health requirements. The specialized actions among themselves or with international organizations dedicated to public health to achieve an effective national food delivery system."

In 2005, Guatemala adopts a framework law on the right to food. Guatemala has included the topic of food sovereignty in framework law, though its status is sometimes controversial: Law on National Food and Nutrition Security System, Decree No. 32-2005, 2005. Agreement No 75/06, Regulation to the Law on National System on Food and Nutritional Security, 2006.

In 2006, the Special Rapporteur leads a country mission to Guatemala.

In 2010, the Special Rapporteur leads a country mission to Guatemala.

=== Haiti ===
The right to food is enshrined in the constitution, Article 22:

"The State recognizes the right of every citizen to decent housing, education, food and social security."

Based on a survey of human rights experts administered by the Human Rights Measurement Initiative in 2017, Haiti is doing only 80.8% of what should be possible at its level of income on the right to food.

=== India ===
The right to food is enshrined in the constitution, Article 47 (Duty of the State to raise the level of nutrition and the standard of living and to improve public health):

"The State shall regard the raising of the level of nutrition and the standard of living of its people and the improvement of public health as among its primary duties and, in particular, the State shall endeavour to bring about prohibition of the consumption except for medicinal purpose of intoxicating drinks and of drugs which are injurious to health."

Fifty percent of the world's hungry live in India, with 200 million food-insecure people in 2008 according to the FAO. India ranks 94th out of 107 nations on the Global Hunger Index.

In 2001, India's Constitutional Court recognizes the right to food, transforming policy choices into enforceable rights. The case started with a written petition submitted to the Supreme Court in April 2001 by the People's Union for Civil Liberties, Rajasthan, leading to prolonged public interest litigation. (Note: People's Union for Civil Liberties vs Union of India and Others, Written Petition [Civil] 196 of 2001.) Moreover, a larger public Right to Food Campaign is founded. (Note: Sustained demands include: (1) a national Employment Guarantee Act, (2) universal mid-day meals in primary schools, (3) universalization of the Integrated Child Development Services (ICDS) for children under the age of six, (4) effective implementation of all nutrition-related schemes, (5) revival and universalization of the public distribution system, (6) social security arrangements for those who are not able to work, (7) equitable land rights and forest rights.)

In 2005, India adopts its Mahatma Gandhi National Rural Employment Guarantee Act and the Right to Information Act. Between 20 August to 2 September of this year, the Special Rapporteur on the Right to Food leads a country mission to India.

In 2011, the National Food Security Bill, 2011, popularly known as Right to Food Bill was proposed. In 2013, National Food Security Act, 2013 was passed by the Indian Parliament. The Act guarantees subsidised food to 50% of the urban population and 75% of the rural population. The proposed legislation would provide of rice, wheat and coarse grain at very low prices to "priority households" similar to Below Poverty Line families. Distribution will be through the current Public Distribution System, a government-run ration and fair price shops.

Regarding India, the Special Rapporteur has commented:

"India provides one of the best examples in the world in terms of the justiciability of the right to food. The Constitution of India prohibits discrimination and recognizes all human rights. The right to life is recognized as a directly justiciable fundamental right (art. 21), while the right to food is defined as a directive principle of State policy (art. 47). As it has interpreted these provisions, the Supreme Court of India has found that the Government has a constitutional obligation to take steps to fight hunger and extreme poverty and to ensure a life with dignity for all individuals."

=== Indonesia ===
Indonesia has included the topic of food sovereignty in framework law, though its status is sometimes controversial: Food Act No. 7/1996; Regulation on Food Security No. 68/2002.

=== Iran ===
The right to food is enshrined in the constitution, Article 3 (State Goals):

"...The planning of a correct and just economic system, in accordance with Islamic criteria, in order to create welfare, eliminate poverty, and abolish all forms of deprivation with respect to food, housing, work, health care, and the provision of social insurance for all."

And in Article 43 (Principles):

"The economy of the Islamic Republic of Iran, with its objectives of achieving the economic independence of the society, uprooting poverty and deprivation, and fulfilling human needs in the process of development while preserving human liberty, is based on the following criteria: The provision of basic necessities for all citizens: housing, food, clothing hygiene, medical treatment, education, and the necessary facilities for the establishment of a family."

=== Lebanon ===
In 2006, the Special Rapporteur leads a country mission to Lebanon.

=== Madagascar ===
In 2012, the Special Rapporteur leads a country mission to Madagascar.

=== Malawi ===
The right to food is enshrined in the constitution, Article 13:

"The State shall actively promote the welfare and development of the people of Malawi by progressively adopting and implementing policies and legislation aimed at achieving the following goals: Nutrition: To achieve adequate nutrition for all in order to promote good health and self-sufficiency."

2009, Malawi finalises its draft Right to Food Bill (adoption is scheduled for 2010).

=== Mali ===
In 2006, Mali adopts its Agricultural Policy Act.

=== Mexico ===
In 2011, a constitutional reform establishes the right to food in Mexico. The Chamber of Deputies unanimously approved the reform. The State now has an obligation to guarantee the right to food (Art. 4) and to guarantee that the supply of basic foods suffices through rural development (Art. 27):

"Art. 4: Every person has the right to adequate food to maintain his or her wellbeing and physical, emotional and intellectual development. The State must guarantee this right."

"Art. 27, Clause XX: Sustainable and integral rural development . . . will also have among its objectives that the State guarantee sufficient and timely supply of basic foods as established by the law."

In 2011, the Special Rapporteur releases an end of mission statement to his country mission to Mexico

In 2012, the Special Rapporteur leads a country mission to Mexico.

=== Mongolia ===
In 2005, the Special Rapporteur leads a country mission to Mongolia.

=== Mozambique ===
In 2009, Mozambique sets up a drafting Committee to elaborate a Right to Food Framework Law, which will submit a draft bill on the Right to Adequate Food to the government before the end of 2010.

=== Nicaragua ===
The right to food is enshrined in the constitution, Article 63:

"It is the right of Nicaraguans to be protected against hunger. The State shall promote programmes which assure adequate availability and equitable distribution of food."

Nicaragua has included the topic of food sovereignty in framework law, though its status is sometimes controversial: Law on Food and Nutritional Sovereignty and Security, No. 163- 2009, Decree No. 03-2007, Reforms and Amendments to Decree No. 71-98; Regulation to the Law No. 290, Law on Organization and Competences, 2007. At present there are new drafts that update, replace or strengthen the existing legislation.

In 2010, the Special Rapporteur leads a country mission to Nicaragua.

=== Niger ===
In 2002, the Special Rapporteur leads a country mission to Niger.

In 2006, the Special Rapporteur leads a country mission to Niger.

=== Nigeria ===
The right to food is enshrined in the constitution, Article 16:

"The State shall assure, within the context of the ideals and objectives for which provisions are made in this constitution,... that suitable and adequate shelter, suitable and adequate food, reasonable living wages, are provided for all citizens."

=== Nepal ===
In 2008, Nepal: A case on the right to food is filed in the Nepalese Constitutional Court, which issues an interim order for the immediate provision of food to hungry communities.

In 2009, Nepal includes the right to food sovereignty in its interim constitution.

=== Nicaragua ===
In 2009 Nicaragua adopts a framework law on the right to food.

=== Pakistan ===
The right to food is enshrined in the constitution, Article 38:

"The State shall provide basic necessities of life, such as food, clothing, housing, education and medical relief."

=== Paraguay ===
The right to food is enshrined in the constitution, Article 53 (Children):

"Every parent has the right and obligation to care for, to feed, to educate, and to support his children while they are minors. The laws will punish those parents who fail to comply with their duty to provide their children with food..."

=== Palestine, Occupied Territories ===
In 2004, the Special Rapporteur leads a country mission to Occupied Palestinian Territories.

=== Peru ===
Peru has included the topic of food sovereignty in framework law, though its status is sometimes controversial: Decree No. 118-2002 PCM, establishing the Multisectoral Commission on Food Security, 2002; Decree No. 139/02/PCM, Conforming the Technical Committee of the Multisectoral Commission on Food Security, 2002. At present there are new drafts that update, replace or strengthen the existing legislation.

=== South Africa ===
In 1996, South Africa includes the right to food in its Constitution (Chapter 2, Section 27). All social and economic rights are justiciable under South African law and the South African Bill of Rights, incorporated into the Constitution, explicitly provides every person the right to have access to sufficient food and water, subject to progressive realization.

The right to food is enshrined in the constitution, Section 27 (Health care, food, water and social security):

"1) Everyone has the right to have access to: a) health care services, including reproductive health care; b) sufficient food and water; and c) social security, including, if they are unable to support themselves and their dependants, appropriate social assistance. 2)The state must take reasonable legislative and other measures, within its available resources, to achieve the progressive realization of each of these rights..."

And in Section 28 (Children):

"1) Every child has the right to: a) a name and a nationality from birth; b) family care or parental care, or to appropriate alternative care when removed from the family environment; c) basic nutrition, shelter, basic health care services and social services..."

In 2005, a case gets brought before the South African Equality Court demanding the protection of the livelihoods of traditional fishers. In 2007, the Equality Court demands an alteration of the fishery policy to comply with the right to food.

In 2012, the Special Rapporteur leads a country mission to South Africa.

=== Sri Lanka ===
The right to food is enshrined in the constitution, Article 27:

"The State is pledged to establish in Sri Lanka a democratic socialist society, the objectives of which include... the realization by all citizens of an adequate standard of living for themselves and their families, including adequate food, clothing and housing..."

=== Syria ===
In 2011, the Special Rapporteur leads a country mission to Syria.

=== Uganda ===
The right to food is enshrined in the constitution, Objective 14 (General social and economic objectives):

"The State shall endeavour to fulfil the fundamental rights of all Ugandans to social justice and economic development and shall, in particular, ensure that... all Ugandans enjoy rights and opportunities and access to education, health services, clean and safe water, decent shelter, adequate clothing, food, security and pension and retirements benefits."

=== Ukraine ===
The right to food is enshrined in the constitution, Article 48:

"Everyone has the right to a standard of living sufficient for himself or herself, and his or her family that includes adequate nutrition, clothing and housing."

=== United States ===
The Constitution of the United States "does not contain provisions related to the right to adequate food," according to the FAO.

In 2017, the US Mission to International Organizations in Geneva explained,

"Domestically, the United States pursues policies that promote access to food, and it is our objective to achieve a world where everyone has adequate access to food, but we do not treat the right to food as an enforceable obligation.""

In the 2021 United States elections, voters in Maine voted 61%-39% in favor of Question 3: Establish Right to Produce, Harvest and Consume Food, more simply known as the "Right to Food" question. It adds to the Maine Constitution that citizens have "natural, inherent and unalienable right to food." The amendment grants Mainers the right to save and exchange seeds, and have the right to grow, raise, harvest, produce, and consume their own food.

=== Venezuela ===
Venezuela has included the topic of food sovereignty in framework law, though its status is sometimes controversial: Organic Law on Agricultural and Food Security and Sovereignty, Decree No 6.071, 2008; Law establishing a Programme on Food for Workers, 1998; Law on Food for Workers, 2004; Decree No. 4.448, Regulation of the Law on Food for Workers, 2006.

== Notes ==
Footnotes

Citations
