= Olanike Adeyemo =

Nigerian professor of Veterinary Public Health and Preventive Medicine

Professor Olanike Adeyemo PhD FCVSN FEnv FAAS FAS FTWAS FISC
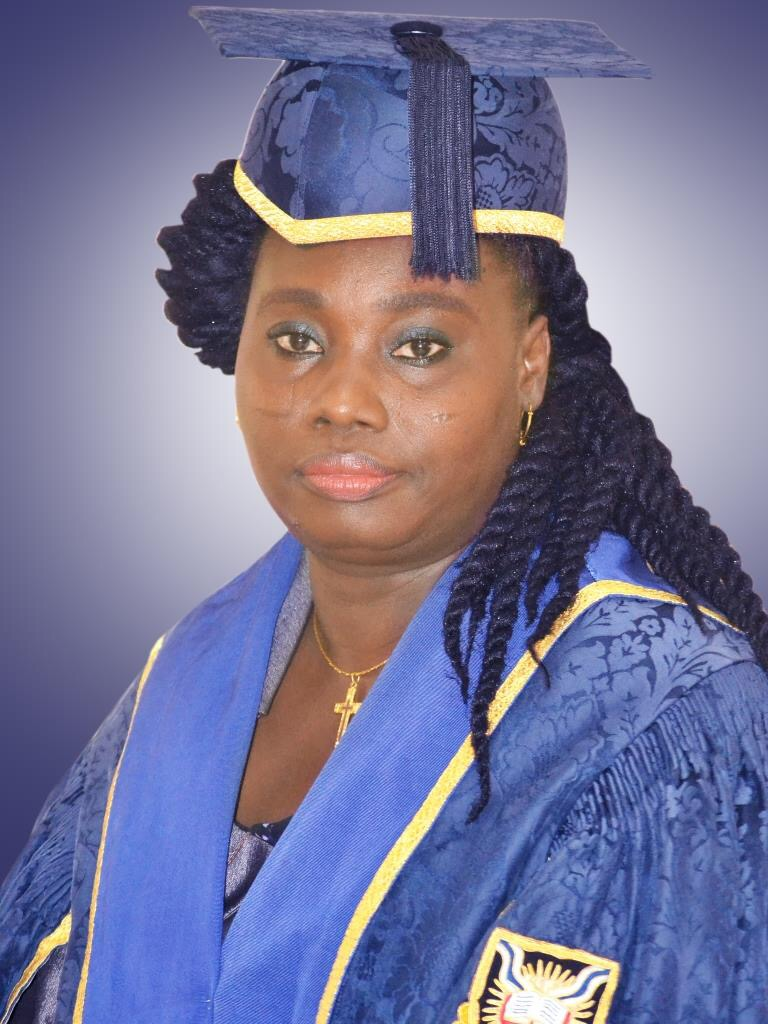
- Olanike K. Adeyemo DVC (RISP) University of Ibadan 2018

Professor of Veterinary Public Health and Preventive Medicine at University of Ibadan
- Incumbent
- Assumed office 2011

Deputy Vice Chancellor (research, innovation and strategic partnership) at University of Ibadan
- In office 2017–2021
- Preceded by: Position established
- Succeeded by: Oluyemisi Bamgbose

Personal details
- Born: 17 July 1970 (age 56) Ibadan, Oyo State, Nigeria
- Education: University of Ibadan; University of Ibadan

Olanike Kudirat Adeyemo (born 17 July 1970) is a Nigerian professor of veterinary public health and preventive medicine at the University of Ibadan. She was inaugural deputy vice chancellor, research, innovation and strategic partnership, University of Ibadan, from 2017 to 2021. She served as the Secretary to the State Government of Oyo from July 2023 to January 2026.

Her research focuses on aquatic and wildlife epidemiology and toxicology, food safety, global public health, aquatic toxicology, and aquatic veterinary medicine. Adeyemo is the first female veterinarian to be inducted into the African Academy of Sciences and the Nigerian Academy of Science. She has been recognised for her achievements by many organisations and has been awarded several fellowships, and has been appointed to several international committees and other bodies.

== Early life and education ==
Olanike Kudirat Adeyemo was born in Ibadan, Oyo State, Nigeria on 17 July 1970 to the family of Alhaji Moshood Akanni Salami, Baale Ladogan of Iseyin, Oyo State, and Modupeola Aduke Salami of Ile-Loosare, Igbajo, Osun State.

From 1975 to 1978, Adeyemo studied at LEA Primary School in Kaduna; later, from 1979 to 1981, she studied at CAC Primary School, Sango, Ibadan. She completed her secondary education at Ahmadiyya Grammar School (now Anwar-Ul-Islam Grammar School) in Eleyele, Ibadan, where she obtained her West African Examination Council results in 1986. Before being admitted to the University of Ibadan, Adeyemo briefly obtained Advanced Level studies at St. Annes School, Molete, Ibadan.

She got her first degree in Veterinary Medicine from the University of Ibadan in 1994. She also obtained her master's degree and doctorate degree from the same institution in 1998 and 2005 respectively.

== Career ==
From June 1994 to May 1995, Adeyemo participated in the National Youth Service Corps program as a Veterinary Officer with the Safana Local Government Area, Safana in Katsina State. She started her academic career as a lecturer grade 2 in 1999 at the Department of Veterinary Public Health and Preventive Medicine at the University of Ibadan after her master's degree program. In 2002, she was promoted to lecturer grade 1 until 2005 when she was made an assistant professor. In 2008 she was made an associate professor and in 2011 she was promoted to the rank of professor.

In March 2017, Adeyemo was elected into the newly created office of deputy vice chancellor for research, innovation and strategic partnership. Previously, she was the head of Veterinary Public Health and Preventive Medicine department.

In 2020, during the COVID-19 pandemic in Nigeria, Adeyemo was appointed the chairperson of the Oyo State COVID-19 Decontamination and Containment Team.

Olanike was appointed by the Oyo State Government under Seyi Makinde as the Secretary to the State Government on 25 July 2023.

Adeyemo is the first Nigerian woman in the field of aquatic veterinary medicine. In an interview with The Punch, she described the manly nature of her discipline and said that she gets along better with men than women. She also explained that she got to the top of her profession through hard work, and gender has little to do with it.

== Other roles ==
In 2011, Adeyemo was appointed an epidemiological and toxicological expert on the Joint FAO/WHO Expert Committee (JECFA). In 2012, she was named a Fellow of the African Academy of Sciences.

Adeyemo is or has been an executive member of the Global Young Academy (2013), member of the African Academy of Sciences' Commission on Women in Science in Africa (2014-date), member of Mauritius Declaration on Ocean Sciences (2016), member of Nigeria Academy of Science Committee on Science Advice in Africa (2019), Expert Group of the High-Level Panel on Building a Sustainable Ocean Economy (2019). Adeyemo is also a member of the Society of Toxicology, the World Aquatic Veterinary Medical Association, the Wildlife Disease Association, and the Nigerian Academy of Science.

As of 2024 she is a member of the Steering Committee of the Panel of Experts (HLPE) on Food Security and Nutrition of the UN Committee on World Food Security.

== Awards and recognition ==
In 2002, Ademeyo was named a Fellow of the Leadership for Environment and Development program in the UK, and in 2007, was awarded an Eisenhower Fellowship.

In 2010, she was named a Fellow of the African Scientific Institute (ASI) in California, and in 2011 was listed in ASI's edition of "Black Achievers in Science and Technology".

In 2016, she was named a Fellow of the Nigerian Academy of Science. In 2017 she was featured in "Women in Science - Inspiring Stories from Africa", a publication of Network of African Science Academies (NASAC); this publication profiled thirty women from 18 countries across Africa who have excelled in various STEM careers.

In 2019 she was named a Fellow of The World Academy of Sciences for the advancement of science in developing countries, and Fellow at the Society for Environmental Toxicology and Pollution Mitigation.

In 2020, Adeyemo was awarded Scientist of the Year by the International Achievements Research Center (IARC).

Adeyemo is the first female veterinarian to be inducted into the African Academy of Sciences and the Nigerian Academy of Science. and the only person in any Nigerian University who is a Fellow, Nigerian Academy of Science; Fellow, African Academy of Sciences; Fellow, the World Academy of Science; as well as Fellow of International Science Council.

== Personal life ==
Adeyemo is married to Biodun Adeyemo, a pharmacist, and together they have three sons and one daughter.

== Selected scholarly articles ==
Adeyomo has publications in academic journals, as well as being a reviewer to internationally recognized academic journals.

- Agbede, S.A.; Adedeji, O.B.; Adeyemo, O.K. and Olufemi, B.E. (2001). Fish food development, safety and security in Nigeria. Proceedings of the USDA/USAID/NIGERIA sponsored international conference on Food safety and security in Nigeria, held at IITA, Ibadan-Nigeria between 1–3 August 2001. 58–69. USA
- Naigaga, I. and Adeyemo, O.K. (2007). Environmental Change Assessment in Africa: Seasonal Fluctuation in the Atmospheric and Water Levels of Methane and Nitrous Oxide in Selected Aquatic Ecosystems in Uganda and Nigeria. Final Project Report for 2006 START/PACOM African Global Change Research Grants, 26pp.
- Adeyemo, O.K. (2009). Evaluation for Sustainability of Aquaculture Development in Nigeria. Final Project Report on 2008/2009 USDA/Foreign Agricultural Service (FAS) grant, 28pp.
