= Food Assistance Convention =

International treaty relating to food assistance

- Ratifiers and (potential) signatories to the convention Party to the convention Party, part of the European Union (which is a party) Signed Signed, part of the European Union (which is a party) Potential signatory, part of the European Union (which is a party) Potential signatory
- Location: London, UK
- Sealed: 25 April 2012
- Effective: 1 January 2013
- Condition: Ratification by 5 signatories
- Signatories: 14: Australia; Austria; Bulgaria; Canada; Denmark; European Union; France; Germany; Greece; Japan; Luxembourg; Portugal; South Korea; Switzerland; United States
- Parties: 17: Australia; Austria; Canada; Denmark; European Union; France; Finland; Japan; Luxembourg; State of Palestine; Russia; Slovenia; South Korea; Spain; Sweden; Switzerland; United States
- Depositary: Secretary General of the United Nations
- Languages: English and French

Full text
- Food Assistance Convention at Wikisource

The Food Assistance Convention is an international treaty relating to food assistance. It was adopted on 25 April 2012 in London. The treaty aims at "addressing the food and nutritional needs of the most vulnerable populations" and includes mechanisms for information sharing and registration of commitments made towards such assistance. The treaty entered into force on 1 January 2013.

== Background ==
The convention is a renegotiated version of the Food Aid Convention, as of 2012 the only legally binding international treaty on food aid. The Food Aid Convention is however only focused on a limited number of food items (expressed in wheat equivalent tons), whereas the Food Assistance Convention is focused on "nutritious food" in general and leaves it up to parties to the convention to state commitments in wheat equivalents or in monetary terms.

== Negotiations ==
The negotiations have taken place in the framework of the present participants of the food aid convention, and there has been criticism that recipient countries and civil society have been left out.

== Signature and entry into force ==
The convention was opened for signature on 11 June until 31 December 2012 for 34 states as well as the European Union. From 2013, it was opened to accession to all states and "customs territories" that did not sign the convention. The convention entered into force on 1 January 2013, as it had been ratified by at least five signatories at that time. As of September 2018, Australia, Austria, Canada, Denmark, European Union, Finland, France, Japan, Luxembourg, the State of Palestine, Russia, Slovenia, South Korea, Spain, Sweden, Switzerland, and the United States have become parties to the treaty. The states which have signed but not ratified are Bulgaria, Germany, and Portugal.
