= Fagbule Olanike =

Public relation person businesswoman

- Born: Lagos, Nigeria
- Occupations: Media practitioner, entrepreneur

Fagbule Olanike (also known as Nike Fagbule) is a Nigerian Entrepreneur and public relations practitioner, and the founder of Zebra Stripes Networks.

== Early life and career ==
Olanike was born in Lagos, Nigeria, and grew up in Satellite Town, Lagos. She started her career as a research expert for Deez Magazine. A friend introduced her to Ayeni Adekunle, the founder of Black House Media, and she was appointed as a public relations officer in 2007; she later became a senior manager. In 2012, she left Black House Media and started her own company, Zebra Stripes Networks, in 2013. In 2015, the company handled digital marketing activities in Nigeria for Dubai-based company Alive Now.

Over time, Zebra Stripe Networks under the leadership of Fagbule expanded. In 2022, she handled publicity services for Netflix in Nigeria, Inkblot amongst others.

== Awards and nominations ==
Fagbule was nominated for the Creative Professional of the Year award at The Future Awards Africa in 2011.
