= Olanike Olugboji-Daramola =

Nigerian conservationist and women's empowerment advocate

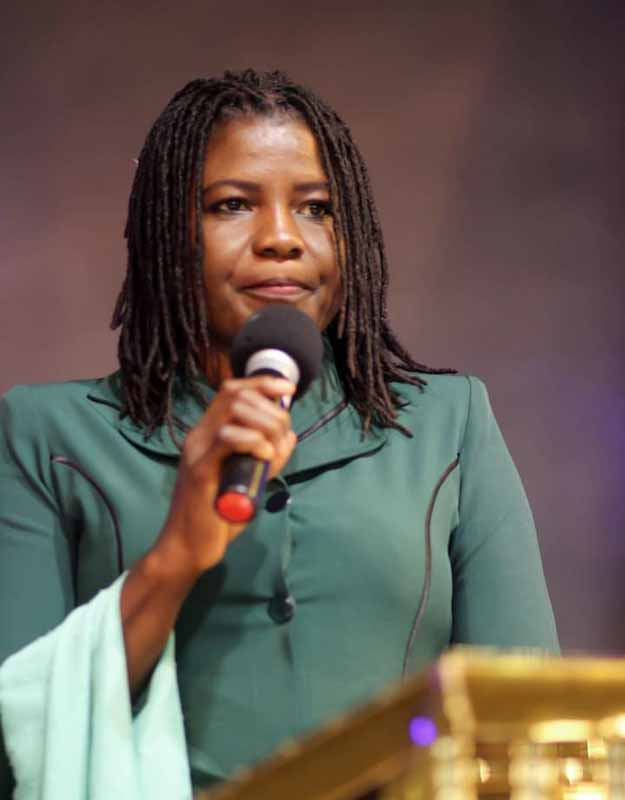
- Born: Nigeria
- Citizenship: Nigerian
- Occupations: Sustainability advocate, Entrepreneur
- Organization: EcoVironment Initiative
- Known for: Environmental sustainability advocacy and waste management initiatives
- Title: Founder, EcoVironment Initiative

Olanike Olugboji-Daramola is a Nigerian conservationist, environmental rights advocate, social entrepreneur, and writer. She is the founder and program director of the Women Initiative for Sustainable Environment (WISE), a non-profit organization that promotes environmental sustainability and empowers women to become environmental stewards, climate actors, and peace builders. In 2006, she was one of the founding members of WEA, the Women's Earth Alliance.

== Early life and education ==
Olanike Olugboji-Daramola was born in Kaduna, Nigeria. She spent her formative years in Nigeria, where she pursued her education. Her educational background includes primary education at Nigerian Air Force Nursery and Primary School, Mando, Kaduna (1977–1978), AWA Nursery School, Waff Road, Kaduna (1978–1980), and Command Children's School, Dantuku Road, Kaduna (1980–1985). She then attended Federal Government College, Kaduna (1985–1991) for her secondary education. Later, she earned her Bachelor of Technology in Urban and Regional Planning from Ladoke Akintola University of Technology, Ogbomoso, Oyo, Nigeria (1992–1998) and her Master of Technology in Urban and Regional Planning from Federal University of Technology, Akure, Ondo, Nigeria (2007–2011).

== Career ==
In 2004, Olugboji-Daramola founded the Environmental Management and Protection Network (EMPRONET), which later transitioned to WISE in 2009. Her work focuses on engaging grassroots women in natural resource stewarding and peacemaking, recognizing that women's rights, roles, responsibilities, and efforts are often overlooked in the drive for environmental sustainability.

She was one of the founding members of the Women's Earth Alliance (WEA) in 2006, She was responsible for developing its role in support of women environmental leaders around the world. In 2008, she was among those who took part in the organization's Women and Water Training in Kenya. Thanks to her developing skills and business experience, she managed to raise funding to launch her own NGO, WISE.

Over the years, WISE has been in touch with 120,000 women and girls. Some 60,000 clean cookstoves have been distributed as a result of their emphasis on clean cookstoves and the training they have offered women, enabling them to launch their own clean cookstoves initiatives.

Olugboji-Daramola is also WEA's Nigeria Project Lead. She serves as a correspondent for World Pulse,} addressing topics including climate change. She has contributed to Time Magazine and has participated in initiatives, in particular the Nigerian Alliance for Clean Cookstoves.

== Tree planting initiative ==
In an effort to combat climate change, Olugboji-Daramola led a tree planting initiative in Kaduna State, where 5,000 trees were planted in 220 primary and secondary schools. The initiative was part of a four-day training on Green Microenterprise Development organized by WISE for women and youth groups. The trees were planted in partnership with the state Ministry for Education and the State Universal Basic Education Board (SUBEB). Olugboji-Daramola explained that the goal of the tree planting campaign was to contribute to minimizing the effects of climate change.

== Awards and recognition ==
- 2022: Appointed as one of five World Trade Congress on Gender Ambassadors
- 2022: Named one of Nigeria's Top 100 Environmental Professionals by Environment Africa Magazine
