= FareShare =

Charity aimed at relieving food poverty and reducing food waste in the United Kingdom

- Formation: 1994
- Type: Charity
- Purpose: Food waste in the United Kingdom, food poverty and volunteering
- Headquarters: FareShare UK Floors 1 and 2 Building 3 White Collar Factory 2 Old Street Yard London EC1Y 8AF
- Location: Aberdeen, Ashford, Barnsley, Belfast, Birmingham, Brighton, Bristol, Cardiff, Didcot, Dundee, Edinburgh, Glasgow, Hull, Leeds, Leicester, Liverpool, London, Manchester, Newcastle, Southampton
- Members: Over 9,000
- Chief Executive Officer: Kris Gibbon-Walsh
- Website: fareshare.org.uk

FareShare is a British charity network established in 1994 that aims to relieve food poverty and reduce food waste in the United Kingdom. It does this by obtaining good-quality surplus food from the food industry that would otherwise have gone to waste and sending it to frontline charities and community groups across the UK.

The organisation works with all sectors of the supply chain, including producers, manufacturers, and retailers. Several major UK food retailers have encouraged their suppliers to work with FareShare to minimise food waste.

== Mission Statement and Charitable Status ==
FareShare is a registered charity (no. 1100051) which relies on donations and company partnerships to carry out its work. With the motto 'No good food goes to waste,' FareShare states that its mission is to simultaneously address the growing issues of food poverty and waste through surplus food redistribution.

Driven by the vision of a United Kingdom in which food waste and insecurity are a thing of the past, FareShare works to support front-line charitable organisations with the provisions they need using surplus, fit-for-consumption food. FareShare specifically focuses on supporting charities that also work to improve people's lives through wrap-around services.

== Organisation and Structure ==
FareShare is a UK-wide organisation that manages 35 distribution warehouses across the UK in 2024. Of those 35 warehouses, three regions, Merseyside, East Anglia, and Southern Central, are directly managed by FareShare. The remaining 32 warehouses are managed by independent charities and FareShare partners. Within this system FareShare relies on a network of over 26,000 volunteers who carry out the groundwork of the organisation. FareShare provides operational support and advice to all sites regarding health and safety and efficiency improvements.

FareShare Go is an app that addresses back-of-store surpluses. Available in virtually every local authority, FareShare Go connects community organisations that have the capacity to safely collect, store, and prepare food with a local participating supermarket. It encourages supermarkets to contact local charities and schools directly when they have surplus food.

FareShare runs warehouses in the following regions:

- Central and Southeast Scotland
- Cymru
- East Anglia
- Glasgow & The West of Scotland
- Grampian
- Greater Manchester
- Hull & Humber
- Kent
- Lancashire & Cumbria
- London
- Merseyside
- Midlands
- North East
- Northern Ireland
- South Midlands
- South West
- Southern Central
- Sussex & Surrey
- Tayside & Fife
- Thames Valley
- Yorkshire

== History ==
In December 1994, homelessness charity Crisis partnered with Sainsbury's to establish Crisis FareShare, a London-based operation which aimed to co-ordinate the redistribution of surplus food from industry donors to hostels and homeless shelters in the city. Marks & Spencer and Pret a Manger were among its first suppliers. By 1999, the charity was operating out of seven cities, including Birmingham, Manchester and Huddersfield.

In 2004, FareShare became an independent charity, in order to expand its operation further and support others beside the homeless. The FareShare network currently comprises more than twenty regional centres throughout the UK, although the majority of these are independently managed by local organisations.

In 2015, FareShare launched its FareShare Go app, which connects frontline charities with local supermarkets that have surplus stock available. Participating supermarkets include Tesco, Waitrose and Asda, and in 2022, Booker became the first wholesaler to sign up to the scheme.

In February 2018, Asda committed to a £20 million investment in FareShare and The Trussell Trust, with the aim of helping more than one million people out of food poverty over the following three years. This included the funding of new refrigeration equipment and delivery vehicles.

=== Impact of COVID-19 ===
The FareShare network remained open and operational to continue getting food to vulnerable people. In the first month of the lockdown, the amount of surplus food received and distributed by FareShare more than doubled following the overnight closure of the restaurant, pub, hotel and catering trades. Supermarket partners such as the Co-op also provided additional food donations and funding to help FareShare meet the increased demand from frontline charity members. In December 2020, the company received a £16 million government grant to support its operation through the winter.

As a result of the COVID-19 pandemic, FareShare's operations experienced a rapid expansion between 2020 and 2021. It signed up an additional 2,000 new charity members, recruited 230 new food businesses to supply surplus food, trained 1,700 new volunteers, and equipped 11 new warehouses and two new distribution centres. In May 2020, FareShare was redistributing more than twice the amount of food that it had been in 2019, estimating nearly 2 million meals a week. By the end of the year, FareShare had redistributed an additional 6,732 tonnes of food, equivalent to 16 million meals, compared to the same time frame in 2019.

The simultaneous rise in supply and demand for surplus food, prompted by the onset of the pandemic, continued 12 months after the initial UK lockdown on 21 March 2020. FareShare was able to distribute food equivalent to 130 million meals in this period, aided by support from significant volume contributions of donated and surplus food from over 40 companies in the food industry and funding from DEFRA, the Scottish Government, and the Welsh Assembly. Companies of note included Tesco, who donated £7.5m worth of food, the Co-op, who donated £1.5m worth of food, Asda and Compass Group, who donated £500,000 respectively of food, and Sainsbury's, who donated £3m to cover operational costs. In the wake of the pandemic FareShare continued to grow, especially in its partnerships.

=== Post-Covid work ===
In 2022, in response to the global food crisis worsened by the Russian invasion of Ukraine, FareShare published the "Cost of Living Crisis Appeal," calling on the government to invest £25 million annually in surplus food distribution. The investment aimed to make the redistribution of surplus food cost-neutral for farmers.

In 2023, FareShare and the University of Hertfordshire released the 'Waste Britain' report on the social impact of food redistribution. The report found that the redistribution of surplus food saves the government nearly £118 million a year and beneficiaries £108 million. This means that for every £1 spent on food redistribution, FareShare saves £5.72 of socio-economic value.

In late 2023, on King Charles III's 75th birthday, the Royal Family announced the launch of the Coronation Food Project. In collaboration with FareShare and The Felix Project, this initiative aims to "...help reduce food waste and support those living in food insecurity."

In 2024, FareShare published its manifesto, "Where's The Food? Strengthening Communities Through Surplus Food Redistribution." The manifesto consists of comprehensive policy proposals to improve and increase food redistribution systems in the United Kingdom.

== Impact and Research ==
Keeping with its mission, FareShare's initiatives are driven by a theory of change framework developed in partnership with NCVO Charities Evaluation Services. This framework ensures that the two primary dimensions of FareShare's mission, that the social value of surplus food is maximised for individual support and that the negative environmental impact of surplus food is reduced, are present in every project. These goals are evaluated with the aid of organisations such as the Carbon Trust and the University of Hertfordshire.

During their evaluations, FareShare and its research partners found that over 90% of the charities supplied by FareShare provide wraparound support services, with 25% providing mental health services, 46% providing advice services, and 32% providing education or job training services. Of the charities that receive aid from FareShare, 57% operate in the most deprived, 30% of the areas in the UK. The types of charitable organisations that receive benefits from FareShare range from community centres to schools to drop-in centres to food-focused organisations. Of the food provided to the organisations, 94% of it consists of good-to-eat surplus, preventing 106,000 tonnes of CO2e emissions and the waste of 141 billion litres of water from waste.

Through its network of distribution warehouses and various initiatives FareShare services over 8,000 charities, reaching an estimated 1 million people a year. According to its most recent annual report, FareShare redistributed over 57,000 tonnes of food in 2023/2024, equivalent to 135 million meals. Over the past 30 years FareShare has provided food equivalent to 236.8 million meals, a provision worth £179.9 million in costs avoided by the voluntary sector.

== Campaigning ==
Since 2012, Tesco has partnered with FareShare to facilitate the redistribution of surplus food. Alongside the Trussell Trust, Tesco and FareShare founded the Tesco Food Collection in 2012, a project that collected an amount equivalent to 528,187 meals in 2023.

In 2018, FareShare launched its #ActiveAte campaign, a national holiday hunger campaign that raises awareness among children at risk of food poverty during the summer. The mission of this campaign caught the attention of England International footballer Marcus Rashford in March 2020, leading to him becoming a FareShare ambassador that same year. Together, Marcus and FareShare spearheaded the founding of the Child Food Poverty Taskforce, which in 2021 successfully lobbied the government for a summer extension of the voucher scheme - a replacement for free school lunches - as well as a Winter Package that lasted until Easter 2021, supporting vulnerable children through the winter of 2020.

In 2019 DEFRA funded a pilot program for FareShare and The Felix Project aiding the redistribution of surplus food from farms. Between 2018 and 2019, the program helped FareShare to deliver 4,447 tonnes of surplus food, the equivalent of 10.5 million meals; however, funding was discontinued after 2019. In response FareShare launched the 2021 Food on Plates campaign which called for £5 million a year from the government to help farmers and food producers improve their capacity for food redistribution by covering the costs of safely storing and transporting unsold food. This campaign was a precursor to FareShare's 2023 campaign 'Where's the Food?' campaign. The primary goal of the campaign was to reinstate the discontinued government funding. In 2024 Prime Minister Rishi Sunak announced that the government would commit £15 million to farm-gate level food surplus redistribution.

The organisation also runs FareChance, a 10-week employability scheme where young people are trained up in their warehouses.

== Partners ==
Since its foundation, FareShare has collaborated with partners at all food industry levels, from farmers to wholesalers to supermarkets. Amongst its supermarket partnerships, FareShare has long collaborated with giants such as Tesco, Asda, and Sainsbury's. Through its partnership with Tesco, FareShare has also associated itself with the wholesaler Booker Group, which Tesco acquired in 2017. Throughout their long history together, Tesco has partnered with FareShare on many other projects, including Tesco's Little Helps Sustainability Plan, which has redistributed more than 100 million meals to an estimated 20,000 UK charities and community groups over the last eight years. In 2015 Tesco was one of the first organisations involved with FareShare Go and the programme is active in every one of Tesco's 2,764 stores, resulting in nearly 2 million pounds of food donated from Tesco every month. During the first year of the pandemic, Tesco was instrumental in helping FareShare increase its food distribution to meet demand, donating the equivalent of 4.5 million meals in early 2020. Since then, Tesco has continued to be one of FareShare's biggest partners.

Other manufacturer partners include Nestle, Muller, and Premier Foods. Most recently, in November 2022, Premier Foods launched a five-year plan with FareShare to achieve a series of targets, including donating 1 million meals and hosting 1,000 volunteering days per year. As of January 2024, Premier Foods had provided an estimated 746,000 meals to FareShare. In May 2024, the manufacturers Arla and Nestle also decided to deepen their relationship with FareShare, announcing that they would donate the equivalent of 1.25 million breakfasts to FareShare. This promise is built on the respective organisations' existing partnerships with FareShare. Since 2005, Nestle has donated the equivalent of more than 6 million meals to FareShare, while Arla has donated the equivalent of 10 million meals.

In addition to its five-year partnership with Premier Foods, in 2022, FareShare extended its partnerships to the food service sector by partnering with KFC and Nando's via FareShare Go. KFC and Nando's donate their surplus chicken supplies, with Nando's having done so for over ten years before partnering with FareShare via their 'No Chuckin' Our Chicken' program. Nando's is also a founding partner of FareShare's UK employability programme, which provides employment opportunities to those enrolled in the programme as well as those who receive aid from FareShare-supplied charities.

Regarding other charitable partnerships, FareShare frequently collaborates with other food aid charities such as The Trussell Trust as well as The Felix Project.

== Awards ==
Over the course of its 30-year history FareShare has received extensive award recognition for its work in the charity sector.

- 2010: Won "Britain's Most Admired Charity" at the Third Sector Awards.
- 2017: Won "Charity of the Year" at the Charity Times Awards.
- 2017: Won "Charity of the Year" at the Third Sector Awards.
- 2018: Won the "Best Social Enterprise Award" at the Foodism 100 Awards.
- 2018: Won "Partnership of the Year" at Ethical Corporation's 9th Responsible Business Awards.
- 2018: Won "Best Corporate Social Responsibility Initiative" for FareShare Go at the World Food Innovation Awards.
- 2019: Won "Campaign of the Year" at the Food and Drink Federation's Awards for the "Feed People First" campaign.
- 2019: Won an award for "Corporate National Partnership with a Retailer" at the Charity Times Awards alongside Asda and the Trussell Trust for the programme 'Fight Hunger Create Change.'
- 2019: Won the "Consortium" award at the Business Charity Awards for the 'Fight Hunger Create Change' partnership with Asda and the Trussell Trust.
- 2019: Won the "Special Partnership Award" at the British Poultry Awards.
- 2021: Won both "Charity of the Year: with an income of more than £10 million" and "Corporate National Partnership of the Year with a Retailer" for its work with Asda and the Trussell Trust at the Charity Times Awards.
- 2021: Won the "Campaign of the Year" award at the Sheila McKechnie National Campaigner Awards for the school meals campaign with Marcus Rashford MBE.
- 2021: Won the "Community Partner Award" at the Food and Drink Federation Awards for its work during the COVID-19 pandemic.
- 2022: Won the Charity Awards "Environment and Conservation Award" at the Charity Awards.
- 2022: Won the "Food Redistribution Award" alongside KRC and UK&I at Food Service Waste Management and Prevention Awards.
- 2022: Won "Corporate National Partnership of the Year with a Retailer" for its partnership with Tesco at the Charity Times Awards.
- 2024: Highly Commended for "Communications Campaign of the Year" at the Third Sector Awards for the Where's The Food? campaign with The Felix Project.
- 2024: Won "Campaigning Team of the Year" at the Charity Times Awards for the Where's The Food? campaign with The Felix Project.
- 2024: Won "Best Environmental Purpose Campaign" at the PR Week Awards for the Where's The Food? campaign with The Felix Project.

== See also ==
- Food waste in the United Kingdom
- Hunger in the United Kingdom
- Poverty in the United Kingdom
