= Pret =

Pret may refer to:

- Preta, a ghost of the Hindu and Buddhist tradition
- Pret a Manger, a British sandwich retail chain
- Prêt-à-porter, ready-to-wear fashion; often abbreviated as Pret, as in Pret-line
- Preterite, in grammar, a past tense (glossing abbreviation: PRET)
