= 2012 Olympic hunger summit =

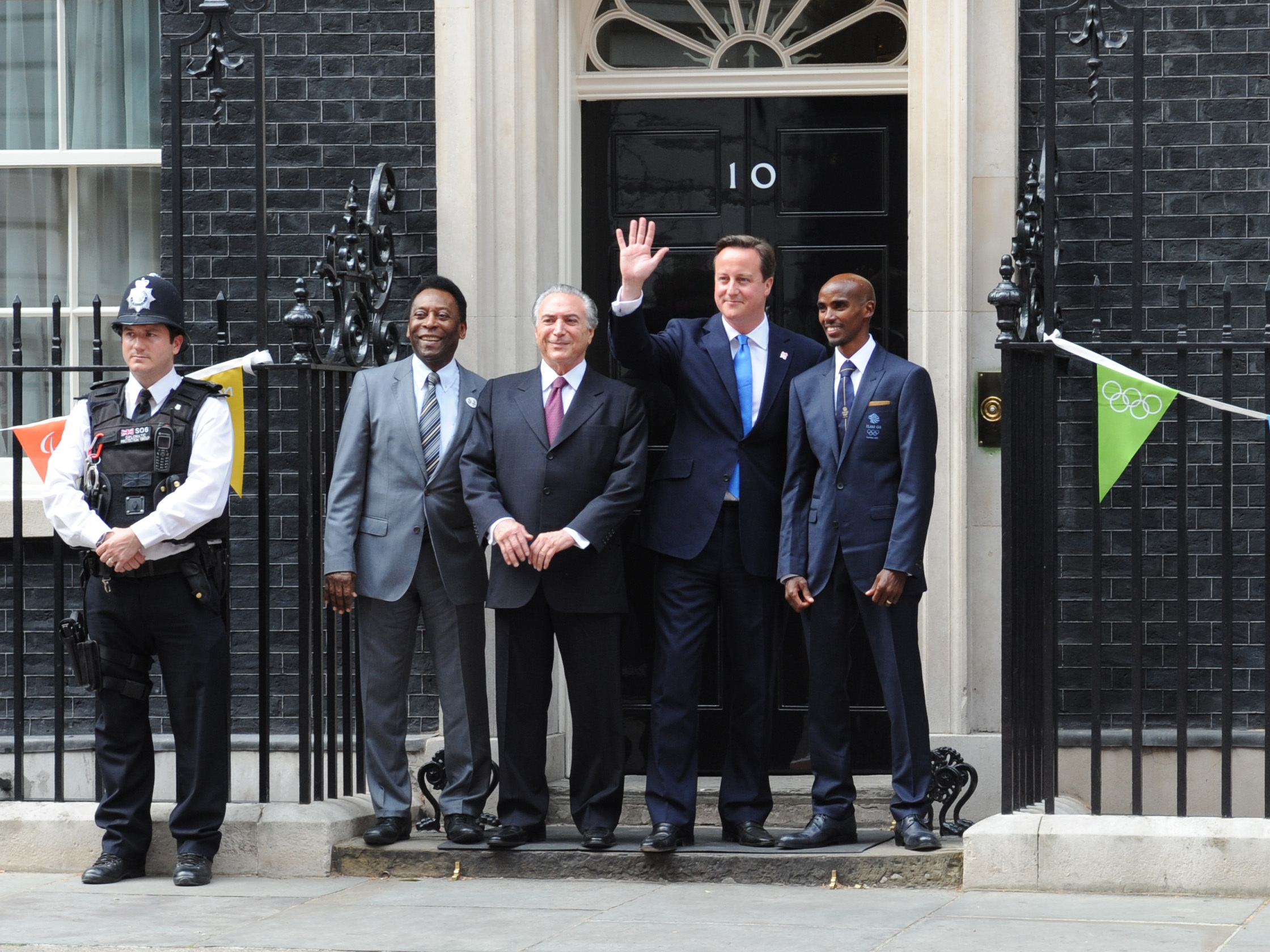
Pictured outside 10 Downing Street on 12 August 2012. From left to right: Brazilian football legend Pelé, vice-president of Brazil Michel Temer, UK Prime Minister David Cameron and Olympic double gold medallist Mo Farah

The 2012 Olympic hunger summit was an international gathering on 12 August, the closing day of the 2012 Summer Olympics, held at 10 Downing Street London. The event was organised largely by the Department for International Development. It was co-hosted by Britain's prime minister, David Cameron, and by Brazil's vice president Michel Temer. The summit was attended by several high-profile athletes and by delegates from various national governments, the United Nations, NGOs and from the private sector.

Since World War II, there had been uneven but substantial progress in reducing the number of people suffering from hunger. Yet in 2007, a lasting period of inflation to the price of food disrupted this progress in several parts of the world. The purpose of the summit was to raise awareness and activity in tackling the problem of world hunger and to announce various concrete initiatives. The event was broadly though cautiously welcomed by aid agencies. It was part of a wider international intensification of efforts to address the problem of hunger.

== Background ==
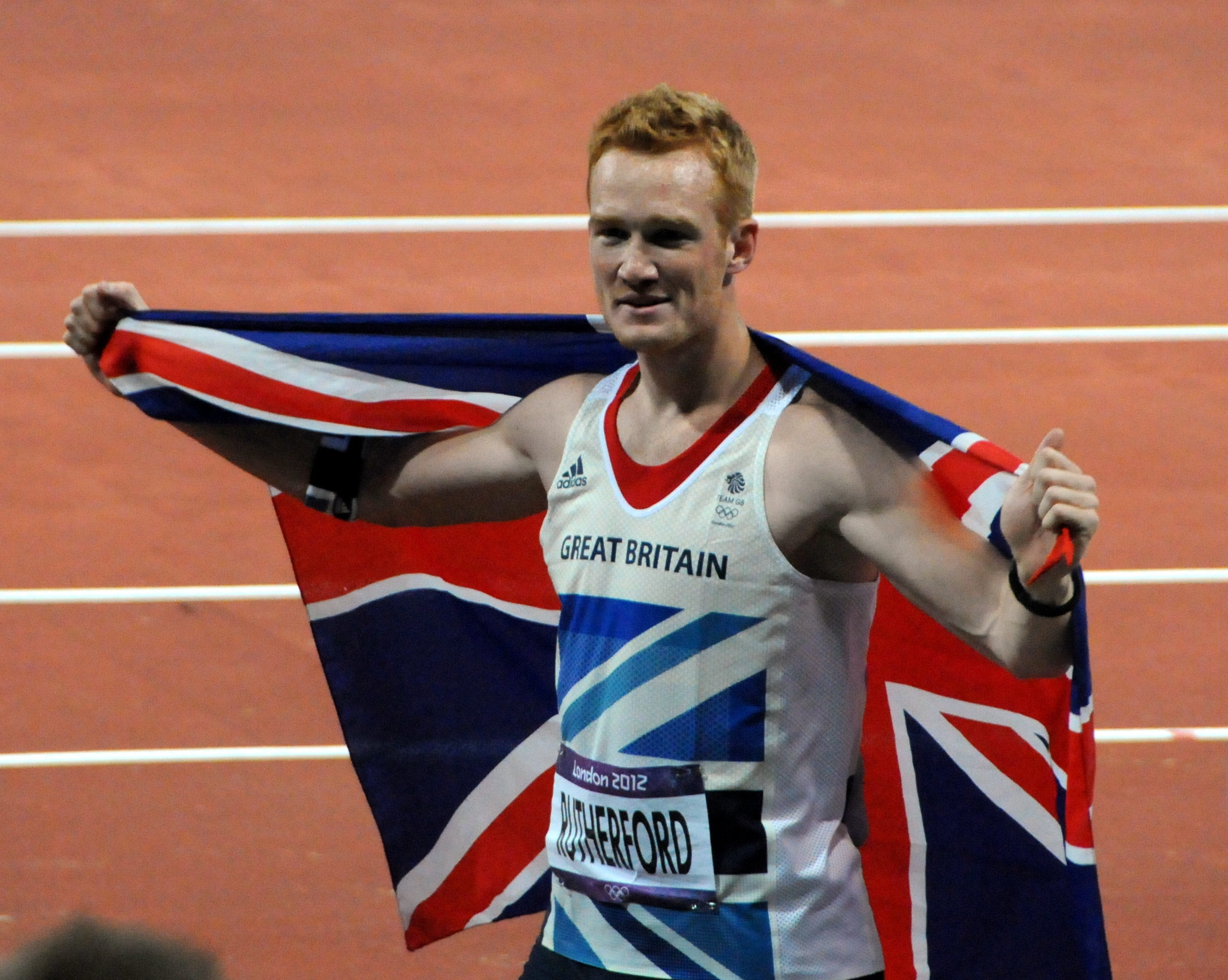
Gold medal winner Greg Rutherford, one of the athletes who urged David Cameron to use Britains 2013 presidency of the G8 to make the fight against hunger and malnutrition a top priority issue.

The Summit is part of a series of international efforts which have sought to respond to the "return of hunger" as a high-profile global issue. While the problem of hunger had always remained a pressing concern for hundreds of millions of people, the previous few decades leading up to 2007 had seen considerable progress in reducing the number of people suffering from the condition. The Green Revolution of the 1960s and 70s had helped propagate improved agricultural technology throughout the world. Progress had been uneven, yet the years that followed generally saw a reduction in the number of people suffering from hunger both as a percentage of the total world population and even in absolute terms. At the turn of the century, estimates from the World Bank suggested that the numbers suffering from chronic hunger had been reduced to close to 800 million, and the Millennium Development Goals included a commitment to achieve a further 50% reduction by 2015. By 2008 it was apparent that meeting this goal would be challenging. In some parts of the world, the numbers suffering from hunger had stopped falling, rising due to the lasting global inflation in the price of food which began in late 2006. In 2008, a global food crisis saw food riots breaking out in dozens of countries, with governments toppled in Haiti and Madagascar. By 2009, World Bank figures suggested the numbers suffering from chronic hunger had increased to just over a billion. Since the L'Aquila Food Security Initiative which was launched at the July 2009 G8 Summit, hunger has remained a high-profile issue among the leaders of the advanced economies. 2009 also saw the launch of the UN's Scaling Up Nutrition (SUN) programme, which has developed into a global movement led principally by developing nations. SUN aims to address the issue of nutrition as well as raw hunger. As a response to the global food crises which began in 2007, some regions have raised production of drought and pest resistant crops such as Cassava. While good for providing raw calories, the crop has limited nutritional value and some strains even have anti-nutritional factors if not cooked properly. Millions of children who do not receive adequate nutrition are at risk of permanent stunted growth, even if they are eating a normal amount of calories. The second global food crisis of the 21st century began in late 2010; the 2011 East Africa drought followed shortly afterwards. By mid-2012, the 2012 US drought and a weak Indian monsoon had raised fears of a possible third global food crisis.

David Cameron announced his intention to hold the Olympic hunger summit in May 2012, a few days after President Barack Obama had launched the "new alliance for food security and nutrition" at the 2012 G8 Summit. British NGOs such as ONE and Save the children had expressed the view that it would be good if Mr Cameron could contribute to the international momentum building to tackle hunger and malnutrition; Britain is due to assume the presidency of the G8 in 2013. Just prior to the summit, Cameron was further urged to do this by a group of athletes in an open letter.

== Attendees ==
- Co host Michel Temer, the vice-president of Brazil, a nation which has made exemplary progress over recent years in reducing hunger among its population, and which will host the next Summer Olympics in 2016.
- Irish Taoiseach Enda Kenny, who plans to keep hunger high on the agenda for the European Union when Ireland takes over presidency of the EU in 2013.
- Other politicians including Bangladeshi prime minister Sheikh Hasina, EU development minister Andris Piebalgs, plus high-level officials from India and Kenya.
- Sportsmen including Mo Farah, Pelé and Haile Gebrselassie.
- The summit was also attended by members of various aid organisations, business leaders from the private sector and by food scientists.

== Announcements ==
A commitment was made to reduce the number of children left stunted by malnourishment by as much as 25 million prior to the 2016 Olympics, with the EU alone taking responsibility for reducing the number by 7 million. India is doubling their budget for improving nutrition and health, which could affect 100 million women and children. The Children's Investment Fund Foundation announced a multimillion-pound annual investment to reduce stunting and malnutrition.

The UN's World Food Programme is to provide assistance for Rwandan farmers to grow iron-rich beans for emergency food relief. Private sector companies including Unilever, Syngenta and GSK undertook to improving the affordability of nutritious food in poor regions. Britain will fund research into crops that are both drought-resistant and rich in nutrients, as well as research into nutritious seeds and tubers, such as the sweet potato.

== Reception ==
The summit has been broadly welcomed by aid agencies. Justin Forsyth, CEO of Save the Children, wrote that the boost provided by the summit to the fight against hunger could turn out to be the "real legacy" of the 2012 games. Molly Kinder, director for Agriculture and European policy at ONE, told The Guardian she was impressed with the substantive nature of the Summit's outcome, and especially with the EU committing to a specific target, something they rarely do. There has however been concern that the partnerships with big private sector players may distract from the role other large Corporations sometimes have in aggravating hunger, by manipulating global markets to their advantage, and in some cases by purchasing large areas of land in African countries and then driving small holders from their farms. George Monbiot says the summit may distract from the West's role in worsening hunger by setting targets that cause arable lands to be used to produce bio fuel instead of food. Writing just before the summit, British food bank network The Trussell Trust warned that attention is also needed for the growing problem of domestic hunger within Britain, where millions are now suffering from food insecurity.
