= Eat (restaurant) =

Chain of sandwich shops

- Type: Private
- Founded: 1996
- Founder: Niall & Faith MacArthur
- Defunct: March 2020
- Headquarters: London, UK
- Number of locations: 2 (France/Spain); Formerly 90 (UK)
- Revenue: (2012) £100m
- Owner: Pret a Manger
- Parent: Eat 2008 Limited
- Website: eat.co.uk
- Footnotes; Registration No. 06522686

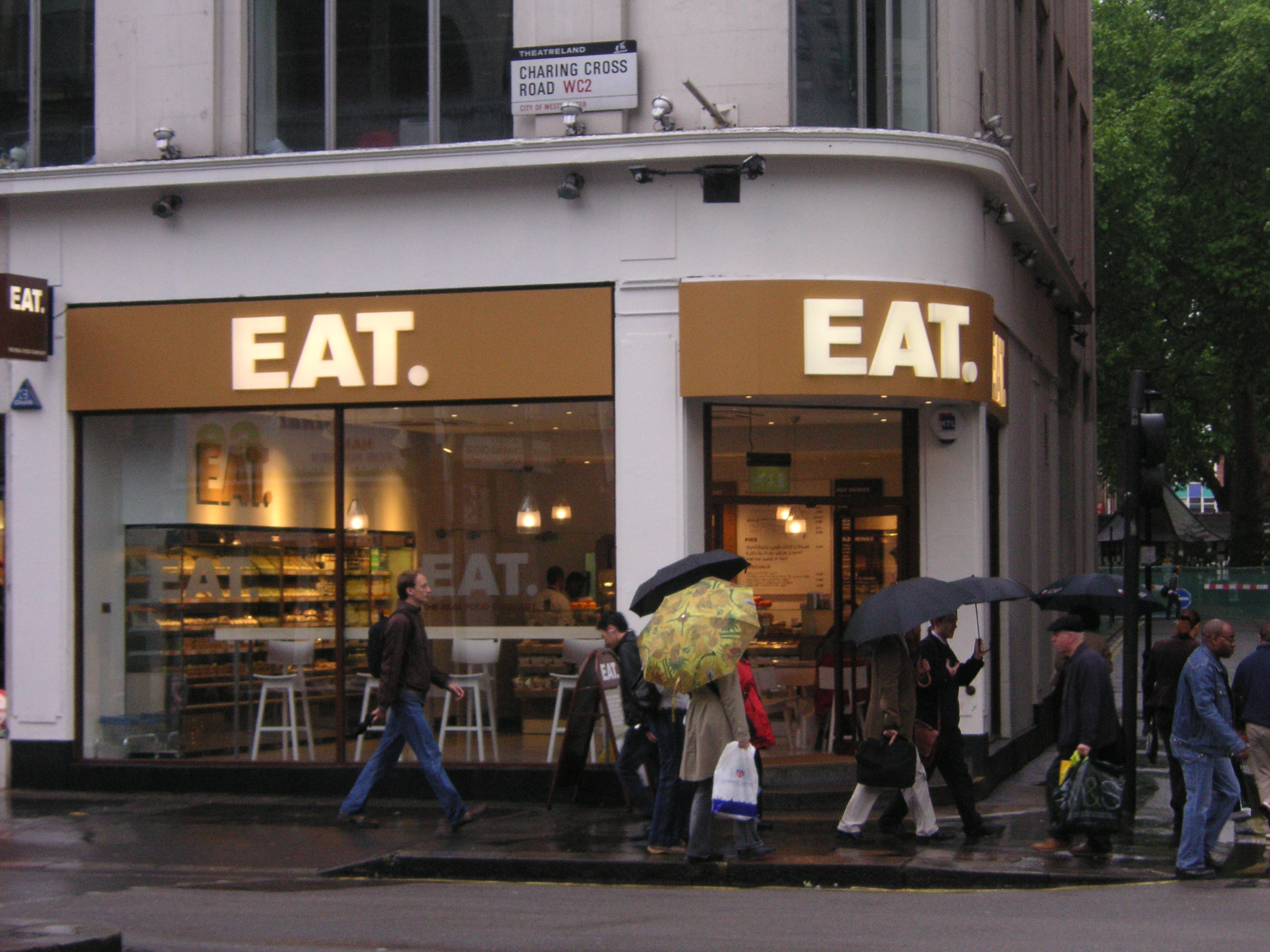
Eat Coffee Shop, London

Eat (styled as EAT.) was a chain of sandwich shops that was founded in 1996 by Niall and Faith MacArthur and later owned by Pret a Manger. It had 95 branches in the United Kingdom, 75 of which were in London. It announced the closure of its UK stores in March 2020.

== Foundation ==
The first shop was opened in October 1996 in Villiers Street, London, next to Charing Cross railway station. Founded and run by couple Niall and Faith MacArthur, the company was similar to Pret a Manger insofar as all the produce was freshly made, although it operated from a centralised production facility. The style of Eat outlets was designed by David Collins, who also designed the look of Café Rouge.

== Ownership history ==
The business, then owned by Penta Capital, which had bought a stake in the firm in August 2005, was bought by private equity firm Lyceum Capital (later re-branded Horizon Capital) in March 2011. Annual sales were £68 million in 2008 and approximately £100 million in 2012. The 2012 profit was £2.7 million. In November 2012, the company opened a £1 million flagship outlet in the Strand, London.

Eat expanded with operations in France and Spain through franchise agreements.

In May 2019, having struggled in an increasingly competitive market and having made a loss of £17m the previous year, Eat was acquired by Pret a Manger. Pret a Manger suggested that it might use the chain's locations to expand its Veggie Pret format to cater for a growing trend towards vegan and vegetarian food.

On 23 March 2020, it was announced that the remaining 90 UK Eat branded restaurants were to close permanently.

== Philanthropy ==
Eat said that it donated unsold food items to charities and hostels.

== See also ==
- Starbucks
- Pret a Manger
- Caffè Nero
