= Pret a Manger =

British multinational sandwich shop chain

- Type: Private
- Industry: Fast casual restaurant
- Founded: 21 October 1983; 43 years ago
- Founder: Jeffrey Hyman
- Headquarters: London, England
- Number of locations: 717 (as of September 2025)
- Area served: 19 countries and regions
- Key people: Pano Christou (CEO); José Cil (Chairman)
- Products: Sandwich, salads, soups, coffees and snacks
- Revenue: ▲£790.1 Million (2022)
- Operating income: ▲£52.1 Million (2022)
- Owner: JAB Holding Company
- Number of employees: 12,000 (2018)
- Website: pret.co.uk/en-GB

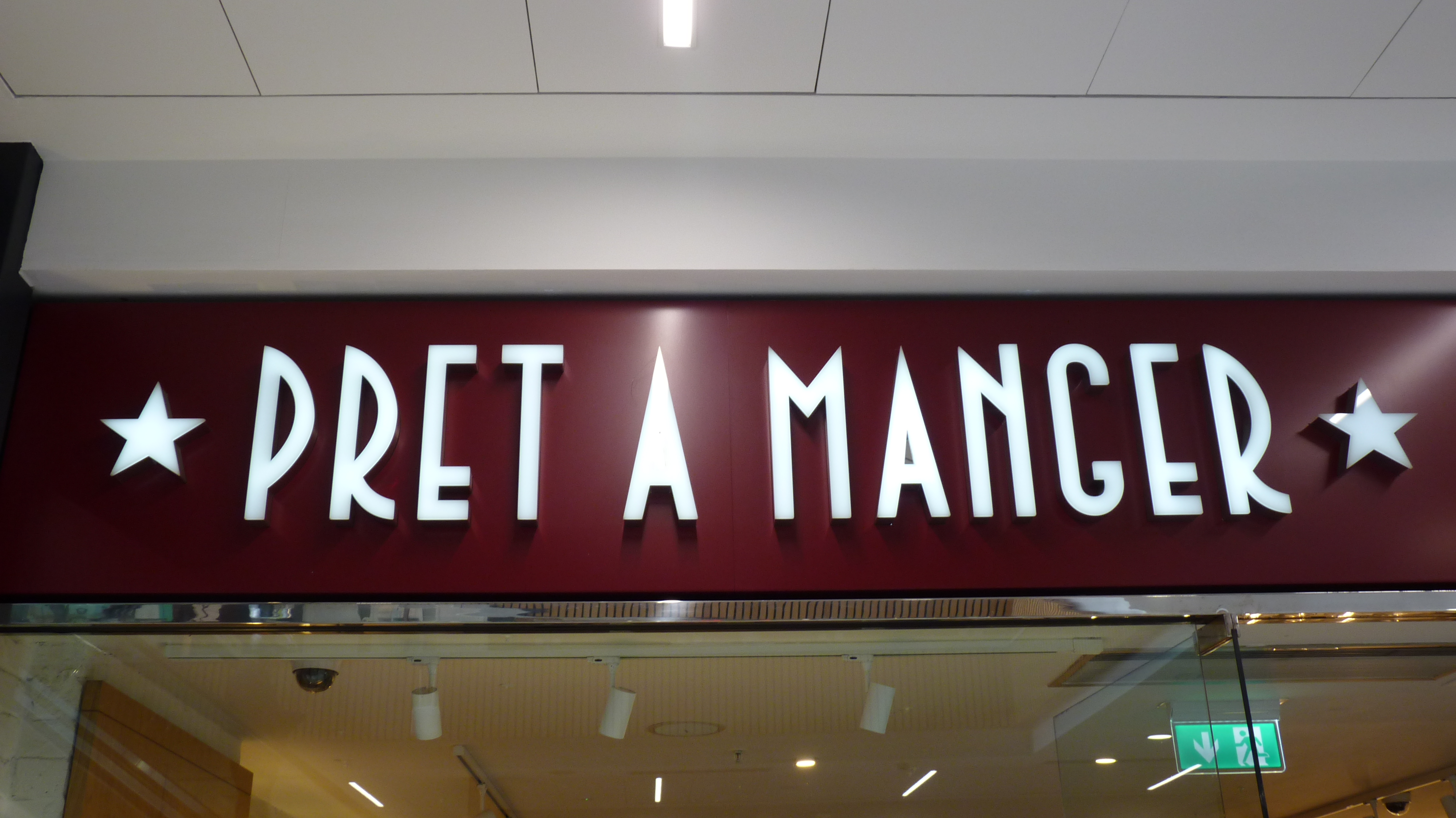

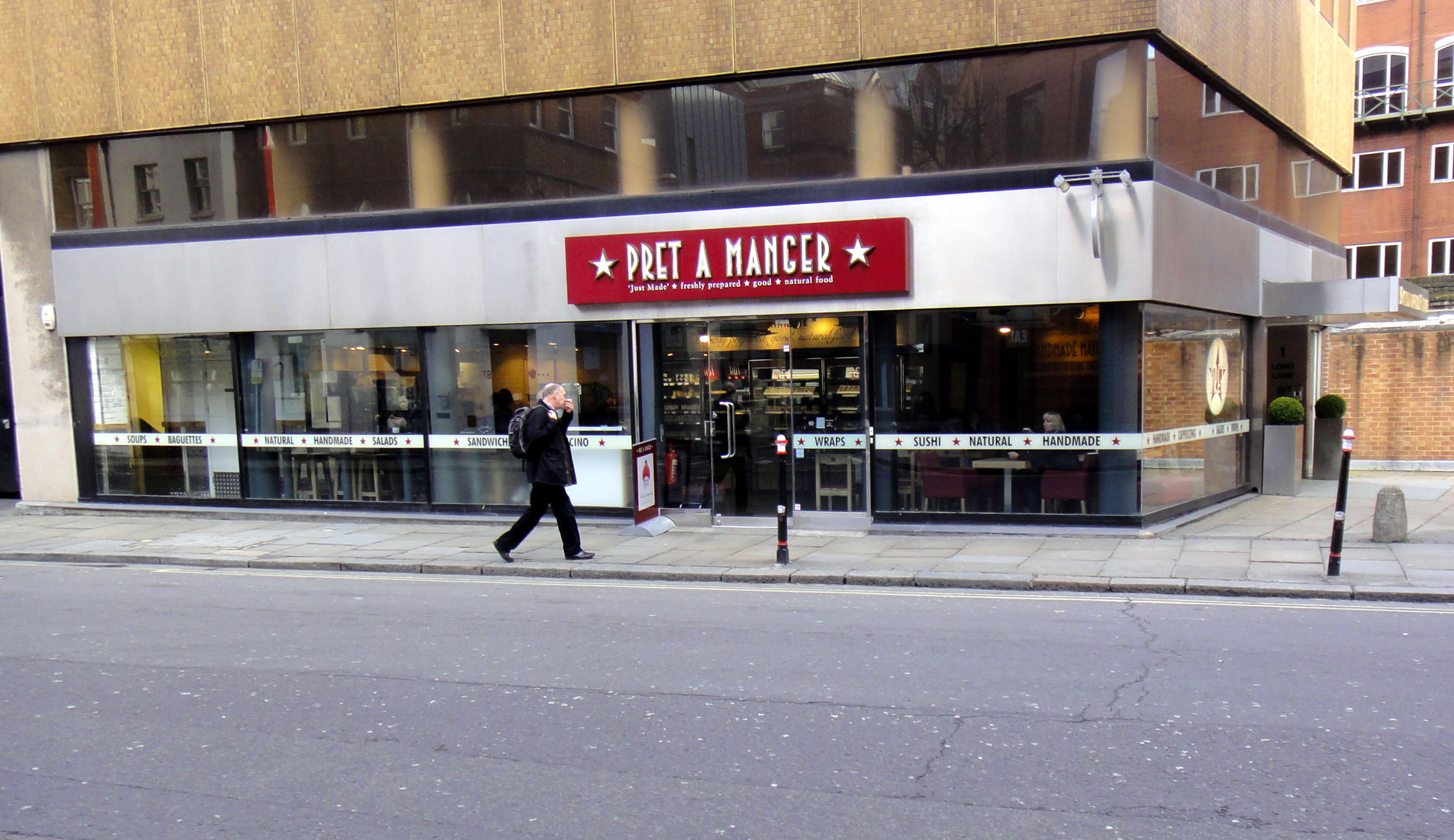
The exterior of a Pret a Manger store in London in 2013

Pret a Manger (/ˈprɛt ə ˈmɒ̃ʒeɪ/; French for "ready to eat") is a British multinational sandwich shop chain founded in London, England, in 1983. It is popularly referred to simply as Pret. As of September 2025, Pret had 717 locations across 19 countries and territories, including 474 in the UK (369 of which were in London) and 67 in the United States. Pret a Manger has additional locations in Belgium, Canada, France, Germany, Greece, Hong Kong, India, Ireland, Italy, Kuwait, Luxembourg, Portugal, Qatar, Saudi Arabia, Singapore, South Africa, Spain, Switzerland, and the UAE.

== History ==
=== First restaurant ===
Jeffrey Hyman founded the first Pret a Manger in London on 21 October 1983. The first shop opened in Hampstead, Camden, in 1984. The name Prêt à Manger was originally based on prêt-à-porter, French for "ready-to-wear clothing".

Beginning in June 1983, the company traded at 58 Hampstead High Street for 18 months, during which time takings fell below the point of breaking-even, forcing the company into liquidation. Both the name and visual branding were purchased from liquidator David Rubin by two university friends, Sinclair Beecham and Julian Metcalfe.

=== 1986 onwards ===
Beecham and Metcalfe started a new operation, using the Pret a Manger name purchased from the closed-down restaurant's liquidator for £100. They opened their first Pret a Manger in July 1986, located at 75b Victoria Street in London. They developed the chain's menu of handmade natural food, prepared in shop kitchens, and remained significant shareholders.

In 1995, Metcalfe and Beecham set up The Pret Foundation, to help alleviate poverty in the UK. The Pret Foundation received donations from collection boxes in shops, funding a fleet of electric vans that deliver unsold food to homeless shelters at the end of each day, including FareShare, The Felix Project and City Harvest. The Pret Foundation has awarded over £7 million to over 100 charities across the UK, tackling homelessness, hunger and poverty.

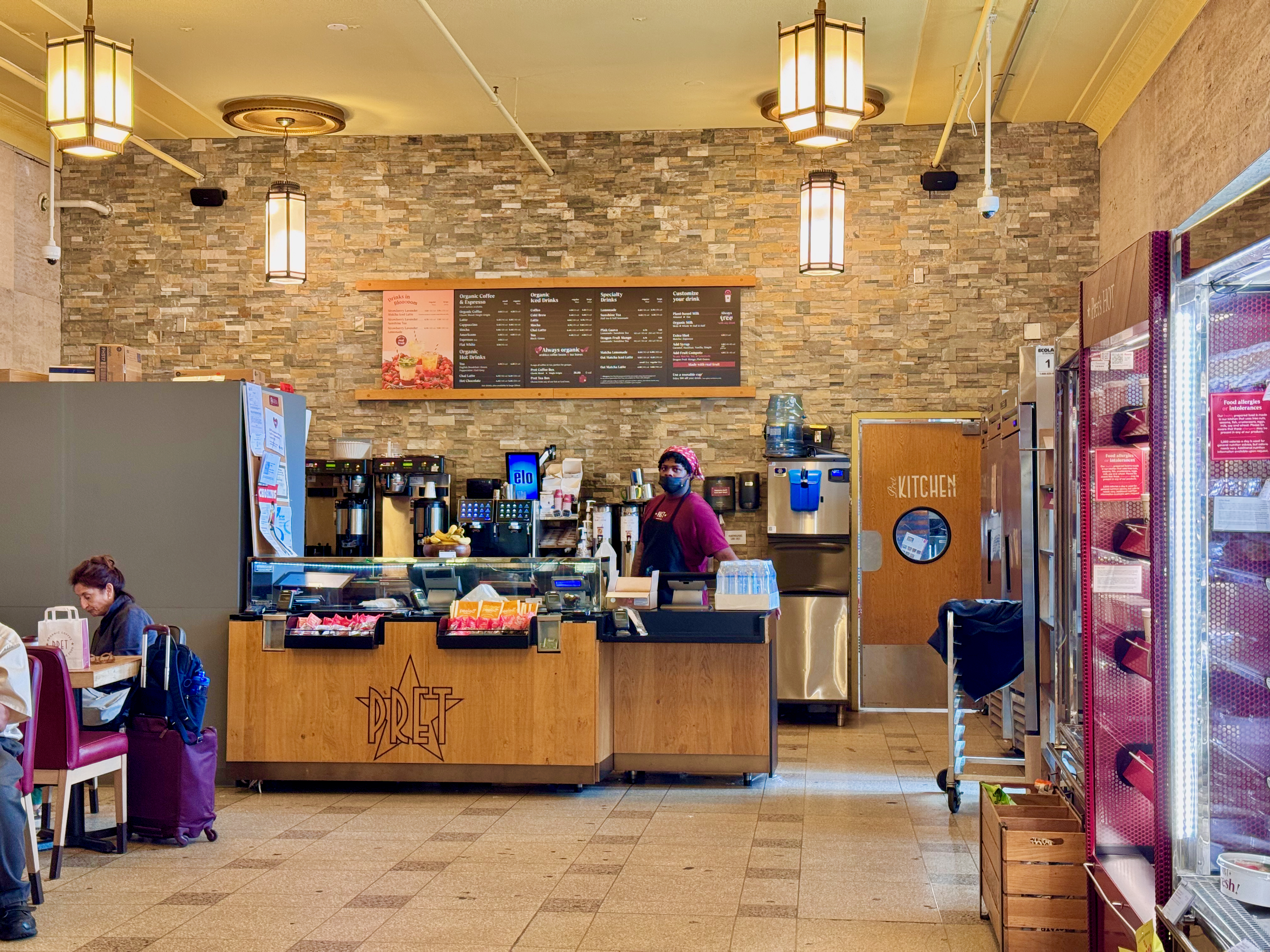
The interior of a Pret a Manger at 30th Street Station in Philadelphia

The first shop outside London was opened in Lion Yard Cambridge in 1996 and by 2016, there were 74 Pret shops across the United States. In 2001, McDonald's bought a 33% non-controlling stake in the company, which they sold in 2008 to the private equity firm Bridgepoint Capital.

In 2008, Pret a Manger's charitable foundation, The Pret Foundation, launched its "Rising Stars" programme, which supports people at risk of homelessness, including former prisoners and refugees, with sustainable employment in Pret shops, training, free travel, gift-cards to buy new clothes and peer-to-peer weekly support groups. As of 2022, over 600 people have joined Rising Stars, with 80% completing the 12-week programme. Some "Rising Stars" have gone on to become shop managers, or have been recruited to Pret's head office in London, known as "75B". 50p from every sandwich on its Christmas menu, 50p from Pret's "Hog Roast Mac n Cheese" and 10p from every soup goes to The Pret Foundation.

Pret a Manger opened its first shop in France in 2012 and had 51 shops in France by 2022.

In June 2016, after running an online poll, Pret a Manger opened a vegan and vegetarian branch in Soho, London, under a new brand name, Veggie Pret, changing its Twitter page for the launch from burgundy to green. "We opened our Veggie Pret pop up as an experiment," Pret's group chief executive at the time Clive Schlee wrote in a blog post, "never imagining it would be around for more than a month. We ended up making it permanent..."

In 2016, Pret's group sales were £776 million. In April 2017, the company opened its second Veggie Pret in Shoreditch, East London.

In September 2018, JAB Holding Company acquired Pret a Manger from Bridgepoint.

In May 2019, Pret bought rival chain Eat for an undisclosed sum, originally planning to convert many branches into Veggie Pret shops.

On 27 August 2020, during the 2020 coronavirus pandemic in the UK, the company announced that it would cut 2,890 jobs from its UK workforce (more than a third of the current employees). The primary reason given was a severe downturn in trade. Most jobs would be lost from shops, with 90 roles lost in the company support centre.

In April 2022, the company announced plans to enter the Irish market, opening 20 outlets and creating 500 jobs. In April 2023, Pret a Manger opened its first outlet in India in partnership with Reliance Industries. In May 2023 the first location in Italy was also opened at Milan Malpensa Airport. In August 2023, Pret a Manger was fined £800,000 for a health and safety offence after an employee was trapped in a walk-in freezer for more than two hours.

In February 2024, Pret announced that it was abandoning its vegetarian-only stores and would be converting its final three Veggie Pret outlets to normal Prets by the end of the month. Later the same month, Pret revealed that it would be cutting the prices of its best-selling sandwiches following accusations of profiteering. Officials at the chain blamed the price increases on rising energy bills and the cost of labour. In 2024, Pret announced major changes to its popular Club Pret subscription service which they had launched in 2021. Where previously Pret had been providing the service at a cost of £30 per month to the customer for a maximum of five hot drinks per day included in addition to a 20% discount on menu items, they announced the subscription cost would be reduced to £10 with the included drink benefit replaced by a 50% discount on drinks, and a total removal of the discount on menu items, a move which was met by strong criticism by customers.

In September 2024, Pret began selling their coffee at A&W restaurants across Canada, which came after a successful pop-up trial run started in 2022 at locations in Toronto and Vancouver.

In May 2025, Pret announced the appointment of José Cil as its chairman.

In June 2025, JAB Holding, the owners of Pret, announced that they had engaged advisors to explore options for a potential sale or stock market float.

== Corporate affairs ==
=== Organisation ===
In 1998, the company employed 1,400 people, of whom 19% were from the UK and 60% were from other European Union member states, mainly in Eastern Europe. Pret a Manger employs 1 in every 14 applicants. Applicants go on a one-day experience day at a shop and their success is determined by votes from the staff members. Many managers and senior executives have come from within the company.

The organisational structure of Pret a Manger is divided between its stores and the main offices. The London head office is the hub for the UK stores, while the office in New York City is the hub for the American stores. Each store contains levels of positions that range from team member to general manager of the store. Above the in-store manager is the operations manager who is in charge of a group of roughly 10 stores, and above that are more senior management positions based out of the offices that are tasked with coordinating a region and maintaining communication with the company's CEO in London. All office employees are paired with a "buddy shop" where they work at least two days a year.

While the uppermost levels of management are located in the offices, not all the office jobs are above the store jobs in the organisational structure. Orders do not strictly flow from the head offices in a top-down manner; instead, the channel of communication between the executives and the stores is open in both directions.

Pret a Manger promotes an internal culture as described in a leaflet entitled "Pret Behaviours". The behaviours break down traits into three categories: passion, clear talking and team working – and identify specific behaviours as "Don't want to see", "Want to see", and "Pret perfect!" The number of behaviours Pret hopes an employee exhibits increases with rank within the company: team members should practise around six behaviours, managers ten, and the company's executives all of them.

=== Locations ===
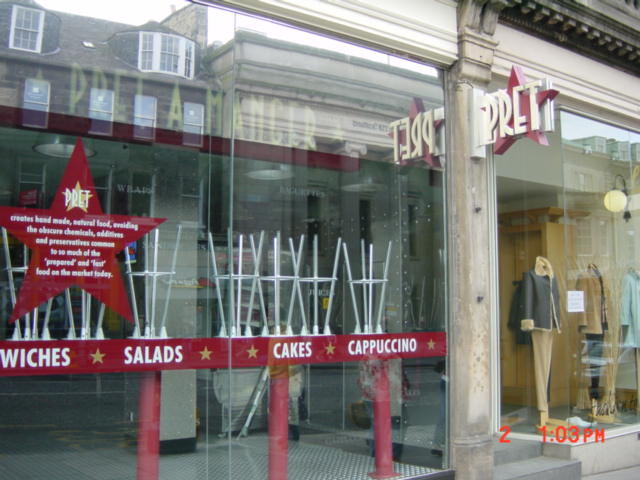
Exterior view Pret a Manger, Edinburgh, Scotland

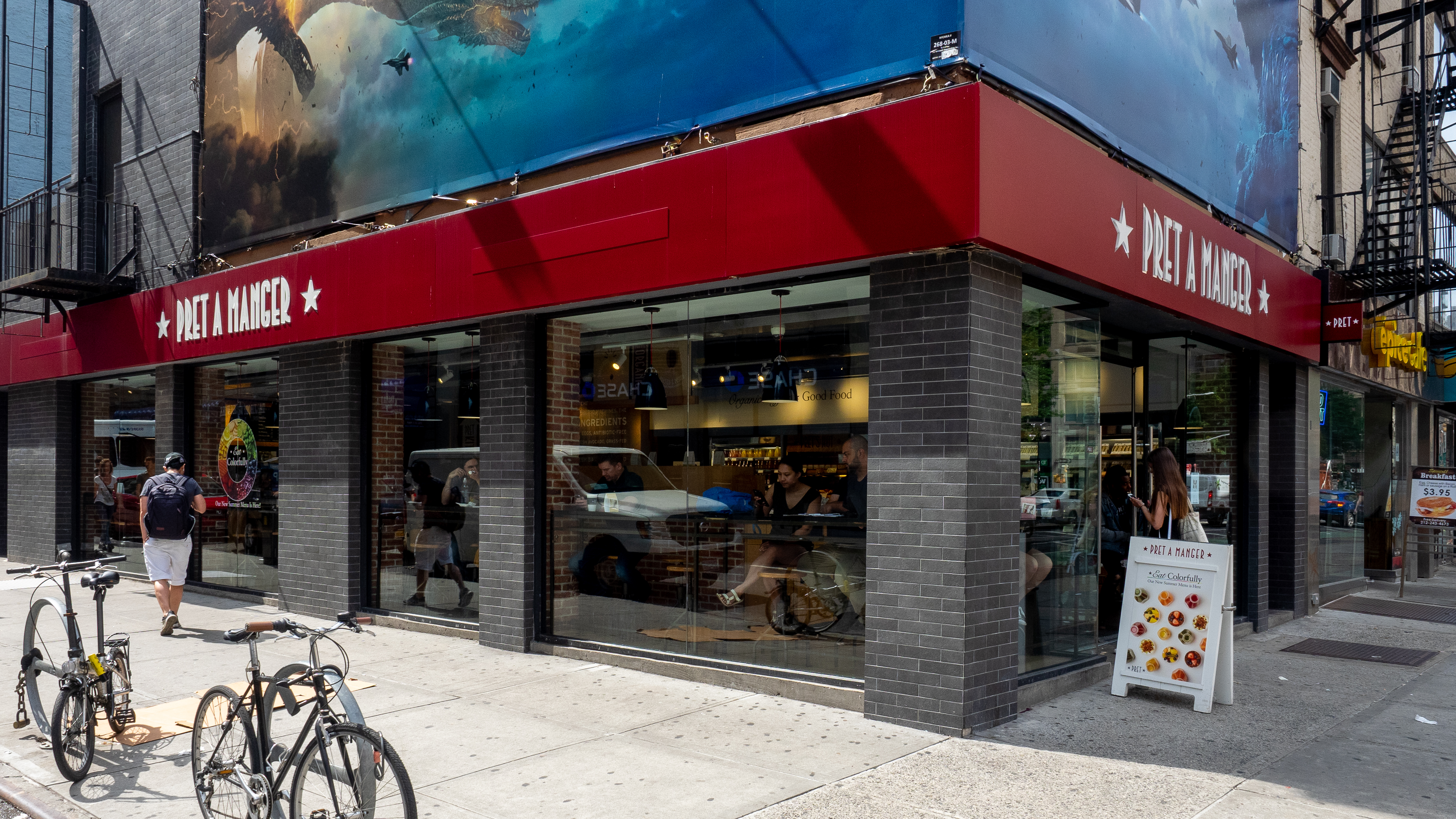
Exterior of a store in Chelsea, Manhattan, United States

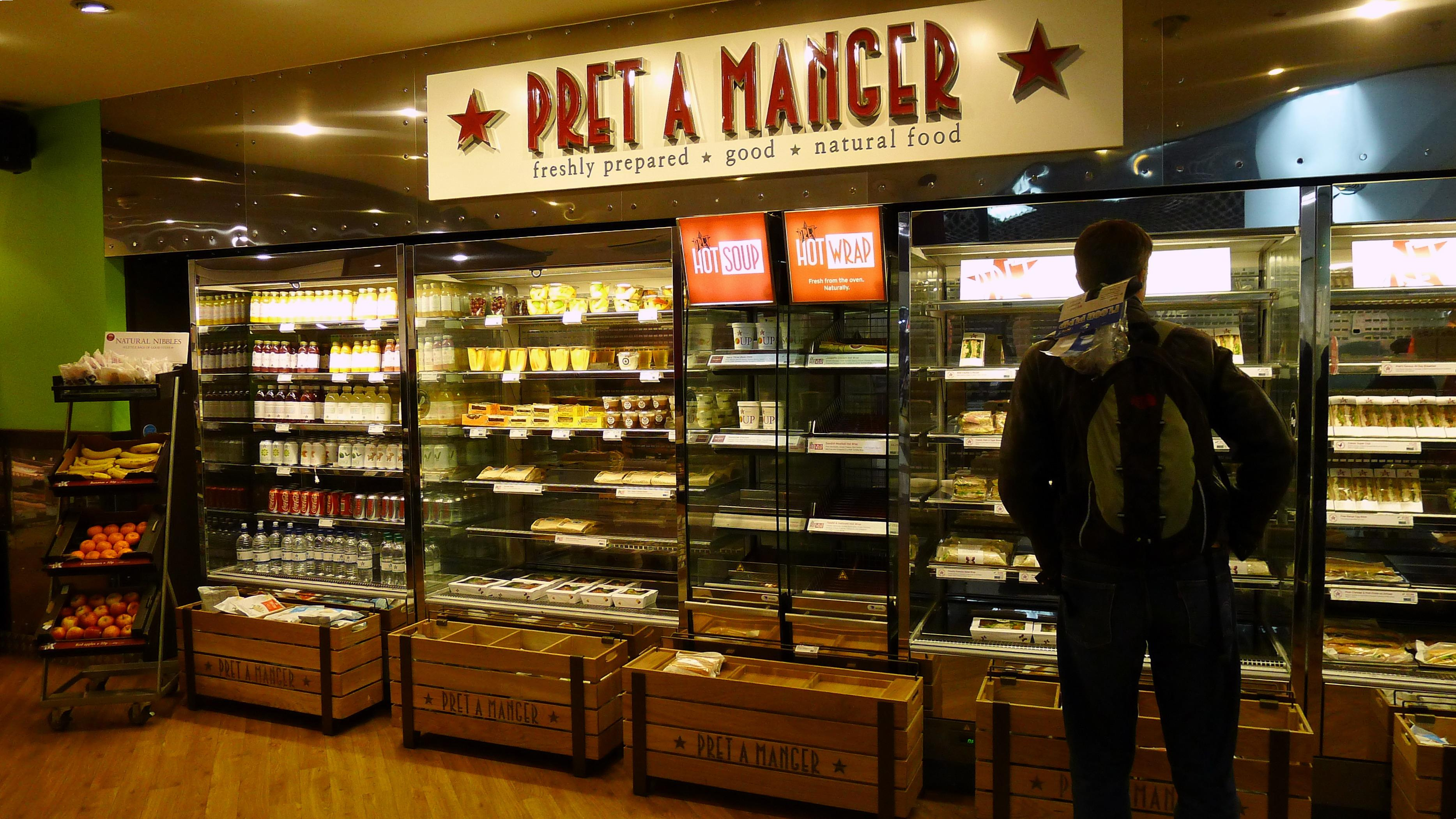
Inside Pret a Manger, Victoria, London

The company emphasises the use of natural ingredients and advertises that its sandwiches are made on the day of purchase in a kitchen at each location (with the stated exception of a few small outlets). Food left unsold at the end of the day is collected by charities. Sandwiches are packaged in paperboard rather than sealed plastic. London is Pret's biggest market where 42% of its stores are located. There are 697 locations worldwide as of April 2024 in the following locations:

- United Kingdom: 512 (486 in England including 276 in London; 23 in Scotland; 1 in Wales; and 2 in Northern Ireland)
- United States (as of March 2026): 68 (60 on the East Coast; 4 in Chicago; and 3 in Los Angeles)
- France: 55
- Switzerland: 8
- Canada: 2
- Hong Kong: 25
- India: 19
- Ireland: 4
- United Arab Emirates: 8
- Belgium: 2
- Germany: 5
- Kuwait: 7
- Italy: 5
- Luxembourg: 1
- Singapore: 2
- Greece: 6
- Portugal: 1
- Saudi Arabia: 8

== Controversies ==
=== Affective labour issues ===
Pret a Manger uses mystery shoppers to ensure that employees deploy markers of a positive emotional state. Employees who exhibit markers of latent sadness face consequences such as not having a bonus. This has led to some criticism of the company for over-reaching while drawing praise from some commentators and other business owners for its business practices.

=== Staff union ===
In response to labour problems within the company, the Pret a Manger Staff Union was established in 2012 as an independent union with its principal demand being made around calls for a living wage. Andrej Stopa, the founder of the union, was later sacked from his Pret branch.

=== Failure to list ingredients on packaging ===
In late 2015, a 17-year-old girl collapsed and needed emergency medical care after a "life-threatening" reaction to sesame, which was present in a Pret product despite an absence of suitable allergen labelling on the packaging. The girl's mother, a doctor, contacted Pret a Manger and was told the allergen was not mentioned on the product, so she cautioned them that "other serious adverse incidents could easily occur". A woman almost died following a reaction to a baguette in October 2015. Despite the patient's family warning Pret a Manger, the firm did not label products with allergy information.

In July 2016, 15-year-old Natasha Ednan-Laperouse died from an allergic reaction to sesame after eating a Pret sandwich, the packaging of which did not list sesame as an ingredient, but which nevertheless contained some. Nadim Ednan-Laperouse, the girl's father, said, "When my mother called and told me that the baguette contained sesame, I was taken aback ... I was completely horrified. It was their fault ... I was stunned that a big food company like Pret could mislabel a sandwich and this could cause my daughter to die." The lawyer for the family said a photograph, taken at the store eight days after the girl's death, indicated no sticker warning concerning allergens was on the packages. The coroner said the labelling was inadequate.

In 2017, 42-year-old Celia Marsh died from an allergic reaction to Pret a Manger products. A product, claimed by Pret to be dairy-free, contained traces of dairy. Pret a Manger blamed a supplier. The supplier, CoYo, disputed the allegation and maintains Pret a Manger hampered its investigations by refusing to reveal the batch number of the affected product.

=== Customer complaints over the coffee subscription ===
In December 2021, the BBC reported that Pret customers complained over the drinks subscription deal with 5000 complaints logged, leading the Advertising Standards Authority to get involved.

=== Fine of £800,000 ===
In August 2023, City of Westminster, London fined Pret £800,000 after a café worker was left locked in a walk-in freezer. "The District Judge decided on a starting point of £1.6 million, which was reduced to £800,000 following credit for an early guilty plea and mitigation advanced on behalf of the company."

=== Stores in Israel ===
In June 2024, Pret cancelled plans to open 40 stores in Israel, with the chain blaming travel restrictions on UK staff as a result of the Gaza war.

=== Frankenchickens ===
In 2018, Pret pledged to stop their use of rapid growth of chicken by 2026, but delayed the pledge to by 2032. Naturalist Chris Packham said he was 'furious' with the move, and promised not to set foot in a Pret store until they produced a 'real, credible plan to stop selling frankenchickens. In response, a group of animal rights protesters placed a large animatronic chicken corpse outside of a Pret store in Spitalfields the day prior to its opening.
