= Hunger in the United Kingdom =

Chronic hunger has affected a sizable proportion of the UK's population throughout its history. Following improved economic conditions that followed World War II, hunger became a less pressing issue. Yet since the 2007–2008 world food price crisis that began in late 2006 and especially since the Great Recession, long term hunger began to return as a prominent social problem. Albeit only affecting a small minority of the UK's population, by December 2013, according to a group of doctors and academics writing in the British Medical Journal, hunger in the UK had reached the level of a "public health emergency".

In the run-up to the 2015 general election, the issue of hunger in the UK became somewhat politicised, with right wing commentators expressing scepticism about figures presented by church groups and left-leaning activists. An All-Party MP group focusing on hunger in the UK has called for activists to be cautious in how they discuss the problem of domestic hunger, as exaggerated claims and political point scoring risk reducing public support for tackling the issue. In a 2016 report, the All-Party group stated it is not possible to accurately quantify the number of people suffering from hunger in the UK, and called for better collection of data. The UK government began the official measurement of food insecurity in 2019, The first report was published on 16 December 2021.

Hunger in the UK was worsened by the COVID-19 pandemic with some food banks reporting that demand had more than doubled. August 2020 saw the United Nations agency UNICEF begin funding charities helping to feed hungry UK children for the first time in its history.

== Current issues ==
=== Size and growth of the problem ===
Since about 2012, the return of hunger to the UK has featured prominently in British media. Despite the extensive coverage, as of 2016 it was still not possible to determine exactly how many people in the UK were experiencing chronic hunger due to insufficient data. Numerous reports, studies and estimates have been published however, with many but not all suggesting that for some sub sections of the population, the problem may have been growing worse since the 2008 financial crises. Research published by the OECD in 2014 had indicated hunger in the UK may be decreasing. The number of people answering yes to the question 'Have there been times in the past 12 months when you did not have enough money to buy food that you or your family needed?' decreased from 9.8% in 2007 to 8.1% in 2012.

According to a 2016 report by The Food foundation based on a telephone survey of 1,000 people, over eight million Britons experienced either moderate or severe food insecurity in 2014; over four million faced severe food insecurity. The report was based on UN data; in February 2019 the Guardian reported it remains the best recent estimate of the extent of hunger in the UK. Due to the relatively small survey size, however, its results should be considered indicative rather than definitive. Also, facing even severe food insecurity doesn't necessarily mean one is experiencing chronic hunger.

The rapid rise in the number of UK food banks since 2009 has often been used as evidence of growing hunger. Critics have argued that the rising food bank use does not prove this; it could just mean unscrupulous people are becoming more aware of food banks, and using their services not to save themselves from hunger, but to have more money free to spend on luxuries. Regression analysis published by Oxford University in 2015 found that it is largely need and not simply awareness of foodbanks that is causing the growth in usage. However the academics conducting the research agree that foodbank usage is not the best measure of hunger, saying that studies in other countries have suggested that most people suffering from food poverty don't use food banks.

Further indications of rising hunger include a growing number of infants and pregnant mothers suffering from anaemia; an increasing number of people diagnosed with malnutrition in UK hospitals; a rising number of children starting their first and primary year of primary school underweight. In 2015 for example, 6,367 children started reception class underweight, which is up 16% on 2012 figures. Official figures published in November 2016 indicated that the number of hospital beds assigned to folk suffering from malnutrition had nearly tripled in the last decade. Again though there is a need for caution on the extent to which such figures really reflect a rise in hunger – an NHS spokesperson said the rise may be partly explained by the health service getting better at identifying malnutrition. Malnutrition has been found to affect three quarters of women aged 16–49 indicated by them having less folic acid than the WHO recommended levels.

The UK government began collecting data related to hunger in the UK in 2019, with the first public reporting of this data due in March 2021. The 2020 UK COVID-19 outbreak and its associated lockdown had a "devastating impact" on people's ability to get needed food, with an April 2020 report finding as many as 1.5 million British people had recently gone a whole day without eating. While the UK lockdown had ended in 2021, hunger remained a concern into 2022, in part due to the ongoing UK cost of living crisis. By June 2023, according to surveys from The Food Foundation, 9 million UK adults (17% of households) experienced moderate or severe food insecurity, up from 7.3% in June 2021.

=== Among children ===
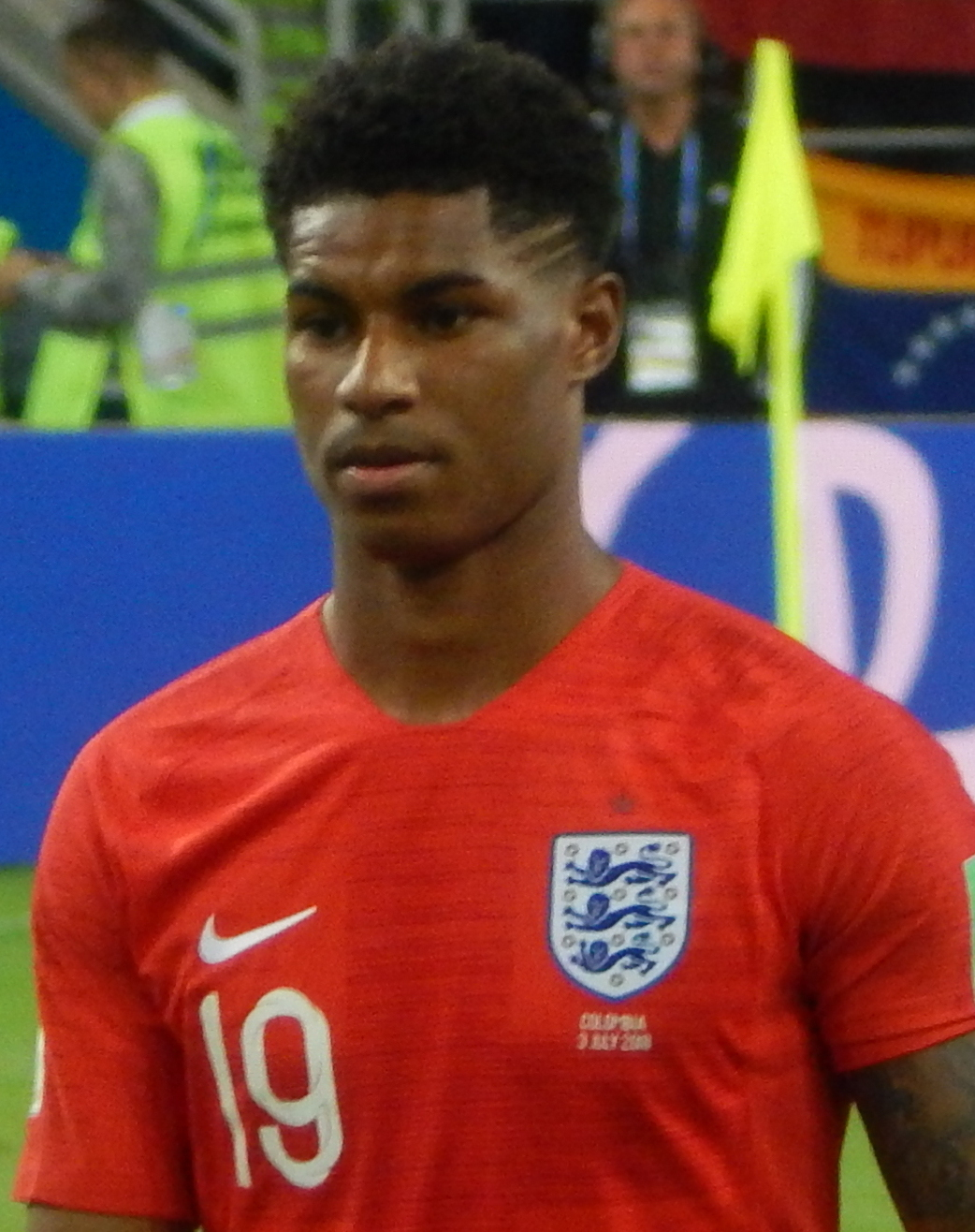
Marcus Rashford, a prominent campaigner against child hunger in the UK.

A 2012 study undertaken by Netmums found that one in five mothers would regularly miss out on meals so as to be able to save their children from going hungry. Also in 2012, London charity Kids Company named five inner London schools where 70% to 80% of pupils do not always have food at home or do not know how they will get their next meal. Children are sometimes visibly malnourished and some lose their adult teeth due to unhealthy diet. According to a March 2013 report, teachers in London schools said that at least five children per class turned up without having had breakfast, with 41% of teachers saying they believed the children's hunger led to symptoms such as fainting.

The UK Government responded to hunger in schools by re-introducing free school meals for infants up to Year 2; this was announced in autumn 2013, and became effective from the term starting September 2014. Subsequent small scale studies however have found some children are still suffering from hunger in UK schools, with a few even complaining of "persistent hunger".

According to an April 2017 report by the All Party MP group on hunger, about three million UK children were at increased risk from hunger during holidays, where they no longer benefit from free meals, and other anti hunger measures available at school. A UNICEF report publicised in June 2017, found one in three UK children are in "multi-dimensional poverty", with one in five UK children suffering from food insecurity.

In April 2018, head teachers said children come into school malnourished and hungry. A head teacher said, "My children have grey skin, poor teeth, poor hair; they are thinner." Another head said, "Monday morning is the worst. There are a number of families that we target that we know are going to be coming into school hungry. By the time it's 9.30am they are tired." A Cardiff head teacher said children often brought just a slice of bread and margarine for lunch. All the heads said conditions were worsening as social and emotional support services were being closed. Over four fifths of heads said they saw evidence children were hungry, and roughly the same proportion said they saw children with evidence of poor health. Alison Garnham of the Child Poverty Action Group said, "With nine children in every classroom of 30 falling below the official poverty line, it is time to rebuild the safety net for struggling families."

Hunger can be an even more pressing problem for children during holidays. Children from low income families get free school meals during term time. During school holidays their parents cannot afford to feed them nutritious meals. After the long summer holiday these children return to school less healthy and less able to learn. This makes it harder for the children to get the type of education that could enable them to escape poverty as adults. In 2018, both the Child Poverty Action Group and the charity Feeding Britain estimated that three million UK children were at risk of going hungry during school holidays.

A May 2020 report suggested that the number of British children experiencing hunger had approximately doubled since the lockdown was imposed for the COVID-19 pandemic. In August 2020, for the first time in its history, UNICEF began funding charities working to feed British children, distributing over £700,000 to various UK NGOs.

In 2020, footballer Marcus Rashford become prominent among those working to alleviate child hunger in the UK. By July he had raised over £20 million for the charity FareShare. His campaign has twice led to government action to address child hunger. In November, this included causing the government to reverse a decision made in October not to extend access to free school meals during school holidays. Rashford committed to "fight for the rest of my life" to end child hunger in the UK.

=== Politicisation ===
In the run up to the 2015 general election, the issue of hunger in the UK became politicised. While the increase in hunger appears to have begun while Labour was in power, church groups and left wing commentators began to criticise the coalition for aggravating hunger with austerity. Right wing commentators and politicians rebutted such arguments for misrepresenting the extent and causes of UK hunger.

For example, in December 2012, Trussell Trust chairman Chris Mould spoke out against the coalition's welfare reforms, accusing the UK government of lacking empathy for those faced with poverty and hunger. A Conservative councillor suggested in January 2013 that there was no starvation in the UK and no need for food banks, saying they enabled recipients to spend money on alcohol instead of budgeting for food, and were an insult to the billion people in the developing world who "go to bed hungry every day".

A spokeswoman for Trussell responded by suggesting that while low earners in the UK avoid starvation most of the time, they can face periods of severe hunger when hit by personal crisis, which for economically vulnerable people can be something as simple as a spell of cold weather, forcing them to choose between staying warm or going hungry.

However, the government countered that the proportion of benefits paid on time had risen from 88–89% under Labour, to 96–97% in 2014. OECD reported that people answering yes to the question "Have there been times in the past 12 months when you did not have enough money to buy food that you or your family needed?" decreased from 9.8% in 2007/2008 to 8.1% in 2011/2012, leading Toby Young to say that the rise was due to both more awareness of food banks, and the government allowing Jobcentres to refer people to food banks when they were hungry (the previous Labour government had not allowed this). In 2016, the All-Party MP group on hunger called for an end to political fighting over the issue, to avoid the risk of undermining public support.

== History ==
=== Pre-19th century ===
Like the rest of the world, the UK has suffered intermittently from famine since its initial formation in 1707. The traditional view held that food was relatively abundant in the UK, or at least in "Merry England" with its "miraculous fertility". Even as early as the 19th century this view was challenged, with medical historians such as Charles Creighton arguing that the effect of hunger in checking population growth was roughly equivalent on both Britain and continental Europe.

Creighton lists dozens of famines which affected Britain, though does not attempt to catalogue them comprehensively. One 21st century estimate suggests Britain suffered from 95 famines during the Middle Ages. Creighton does, however, write that sometimes a generation or more would go by between famines, and that evidence suggests that in normal times, the standard of living was higher for peasants in Britain compared with their counterparts on the continent. It was only in the late 18th century that Britain, as the world's first country to industrialize, was apparently able to overcome the risk of famine, at least on the mainland. Hunger continued to afflict a sizable minority of the population, however, specifically those who lived on incomes well below average.

=== 19th and 20th century ===
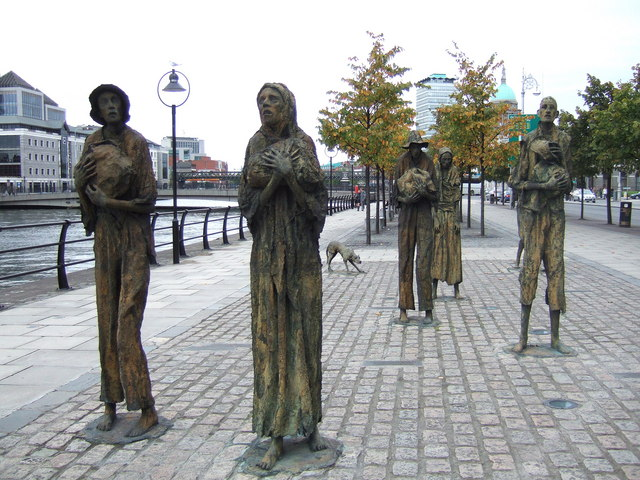
A hunger memorial near Customs House in Dublin, depicting people starving due to the Great Famine, who are trying to leave Ireland via ships from the nearby quay.

Improvements in agricultural technology, transportation, and the wider economy meant that for most of the 19th and 20th centuries, severe hunger receded as a problem within the United Kingdom. An exception occurred in the 1840s. Known as the Hungry Forties, various problems affecting food production resulted in millions suffering from hunger all over Europe. In the early 1840s the UK was relatively less affected than the rest of Europe. Yet thousands of working-class people still starved to death, including in England, Scotland and Wales, in part as it had become illegal to give poor people aid.

In Ireland, which was part of the UK at the time, the Great Famine struck in 1845, and over a million died of hunger and related disease. From the late 1850s, the availability of food and the ability of even the poorest to pay for it generally improved. The 1920s and 30s were an exception to this. There was no famine, yet mass unemployment became a problem in several parts of the UK. While the New Poor Law had been relaxed, workhouses were still in existence, and without a well-paying job, it was often difficult for working-class people to feed themselves and their families. The UK saw a number of hunger marches in the 1920s and 30s, with the biggest being the National Hunger March 1932 and perhaps the most famous being the Jarrow crusade. From the outbreak of World War II, unemployment swiftly vanished, and remained very low in the UK for decades afterwards. Food was often limited during the war and the first few years after, but a rationing system generally ensured no individual would overly suffer from hunger. With a relatively generous and inclusive welfare state established after the war, and with food prices often falling in real terms, hunger within the UK was no longer a pressing problem for the second half of the 20th century.

=== 21st century ===
Until about 2009, severe hunger was rarely considered a problem which afflicted people living within the borders of the United Kingdom. There were a few exceptions - a tiny minority of people might "fall through the cracks" in the welfare system. While some hunger relief efforts were undertaken by civil society, this was generally just provided on a local and mostly informal basis. This began to change in 2004 when The Trussell Trust established a franchise model for UK food banks, though they only had two establishments. This attracted little media attention at the time – before the Great Recession even the concept of "food banks" was virtually unknown in the UK.

Like most of the rest of the world, economic conditions in the UK were adversely affected by the 2007–2008 world food price crisis and especially by the Great Recession. For the first couple of years after the crisis, the rise in hunger was checked in part by the UK government's fiscal stimulus, which boosted public spending to head off the threat of depression. Yet by 2010, stimulus policies began to be replaced with an austerity programme. Low earners would increasingly see their incomes fall further due to enforced cuts in working hours and sometimes even to rates of pay. People who had suffered lasting falls to their income began to draw down savings and run out of friends of whom they were willing to ask for help, leading to increases in the numbers suffering from hunger.

In 2006, Trussell food banks operated in six local authorities, by 2009 this number had risen to 29. The pace of growth accelerated sharply from 2009: by 2013 Trussell was operating food banks in 251 local authorities.

In a September 2012 report for Newsnight, economics editor Paul Mason said that hunger had returned to Britain as a substantial problem for the first time since the 1930s. He said that about 43% of those needing emergency food assistance from food banks had been affected by benefit disruption – this can take various forms – for example, sometimes when there is a change of circumstance, such as a new resident coming to live at the family home, delays can arise in the payments of further benefits. Mason also reported that a reason even people in work or on full benefits are often needing emergency food is debt; in particular due to the sophisticated tactics now being used by door-to-door lenders, where borrowers come to think of the credit company agent as a personal friend and so will make sacrifices in order to make repayments.

In October 2012, as part of the BBC documentary Britain's Hidden Hunger, director David Modell highlighted the way in which internet-based loan providers can also cause people to go hungry. Their contracts sometimes allow them to take out the entire balance from their debtor's accounts, at a time of their choosing. Sometimes this happens just after a benefit payment had gone in, meaning the recipient may not have any money to buy food for at least a week. In late-2012, a Muslim-run charity Sufra was launched to raise awareness and fight food poverty in the United Kingdom.

In February 2013, Olivier De Schutter, a senior UN official warned the UK's government against leaving too much responsibility for aiding Britain's hungry to the voluntary sector.

Later in 2013, DEFRA, a government department, commissioned research into the growing dependence on food banks, breakfast clubs and soup kitchens.

In October 2013, the Red Cross announced it will start providing hunger relief in Britain for the first time since World War II. Also in October, an all-party parliamentary group was established to investigate and raise awareness of hunger in Britain.

In December 2013, an e-petition by hunger relief campaigner Jack Monroe led to a parliamentary debate on hunger in the UK. Also in December, a group of doctors and academics wrote to the peer-reviewed British Medical Journal, noting recent developments such as a doubling in the number of malnutrition cases received by hospitals, and stating that hunger in the UK had reached the level of a "public health emergency". The letter argued that those who are not actually starving are frequently forced to buy and eat cheaper, less healthy food. The BMJ published in 2015:

For the poorest in our society, up to 35% of disposable income will now be needed for food, compared to less than 9% for the more wealthy. This will increase reliance on cheap, highly processed, high fat, high sugar, high salt, and calorie-dense, unhealthy foods. Re-emerging problems of poor public health nutrition such as rickets and malnutrition in the elderly are also causes for concern.

— John D Middleton Vice president John R Ashton, Simon Capewell Faculty of Public Health

The BMJ argued that "a national surveillance system of emergency food aid in the UK, of who is at risk of food poverty, and of malnutrition is needed." Health Minister Dan Poulter argued that the rise in malnutrition could be partly due to better diagnosis and detection by health professionals of people at risk.

In February 2014, the report on food aid commissioned by DEFRA was published, finding that people generally turn to food banks only in desperation, refuting claims that food aid users commonly accept free food just so as to have extra money for other purchases. Also in February, a cross denominational group of bishops and other church leaders criticised the UK government's welfare reforms for worsening the hunger crisis. Church leaders launched the End Hunger Fast campaign, with a national fast planned for 4 April to help further raise awareness of hunger in the UK.

Just prior to the release of the all-party parliamentary report in December 2014, archbishop Justin Welby stated that hunger "stalks large parts of the country" and that it shocked him more than the suffering he witnessed in Africa because in the UK it was so unexpected. According to the report, key reasons for the rise of hunger in the UK include delays in paying benefits and welfare sanctions. The report also stated that in contrast to the first few decades after World War II, poor people's incomes stopped rising in line with increased costs for housing, utility bills and food. The Trussell Trust reports that numbers receiving help from food banks is steadily rising and claimed that reached 1.1 million in 2015. However the Trust was forced to admit that this number represented the number of visits to food banks, not the number of different people receiving help, which it estimated at 500,000. There is a further hidden problem of people who remain hungry because nobody in a position to refer them to a food bank recognises their need.

In 2018, food bank use in the UK reached its highest rate on record to that point. Over 1,332,000 three-day emergency food supplies were delivered to people in crisis from March 2017 to March 2018, a 13% increase to what was reported prior and reported as a "significant increase" since April 2016. It was also reported that welfare benefits failed to cover basic living costs.

According to the Human Rights Watch May 2019 report, tens of thousands of families in the UK did not have enough food for survival and turned towards sources of non-state charitable aid.

In June 2023, The Trussell Trust that owns more than 1,200 food banks in the UK estimated 11.3 million people faced hunger over the course of one year.

== Comparison to other countries ==
A 2012 survey by the OECD found that 8.1% of Britons answered yes to the question "Have there been times in the past 12 months when you did not have enough money to buy food that you or your family needed?", which was less than neighbouring France (10%) and the EU (11.5%) and OECD (13.2%) average, as well as the United States (22%). However it was more than Germany.

Analyses by the Food Foundation thinktank published in 2016, ranked the UK in the bottom half of European countries for food insecurity. In summer 2017 Unicef published a set of related reports looking at progress at meeting the Sustainable Development Goals in relation to children, including the reduction of hunger, across the globe, and in some cases with a focus on high income countries. On a metric for the % of children under 15 living in a severely food insecure household, the UK was the worst performing member of the EU. In an indicator looking at overall progress to "end hunger, achieve food security and improve nutrition", the UK was the 8th worst performer out of 41 high income countries.

== Attitudes towards hunger relief ==
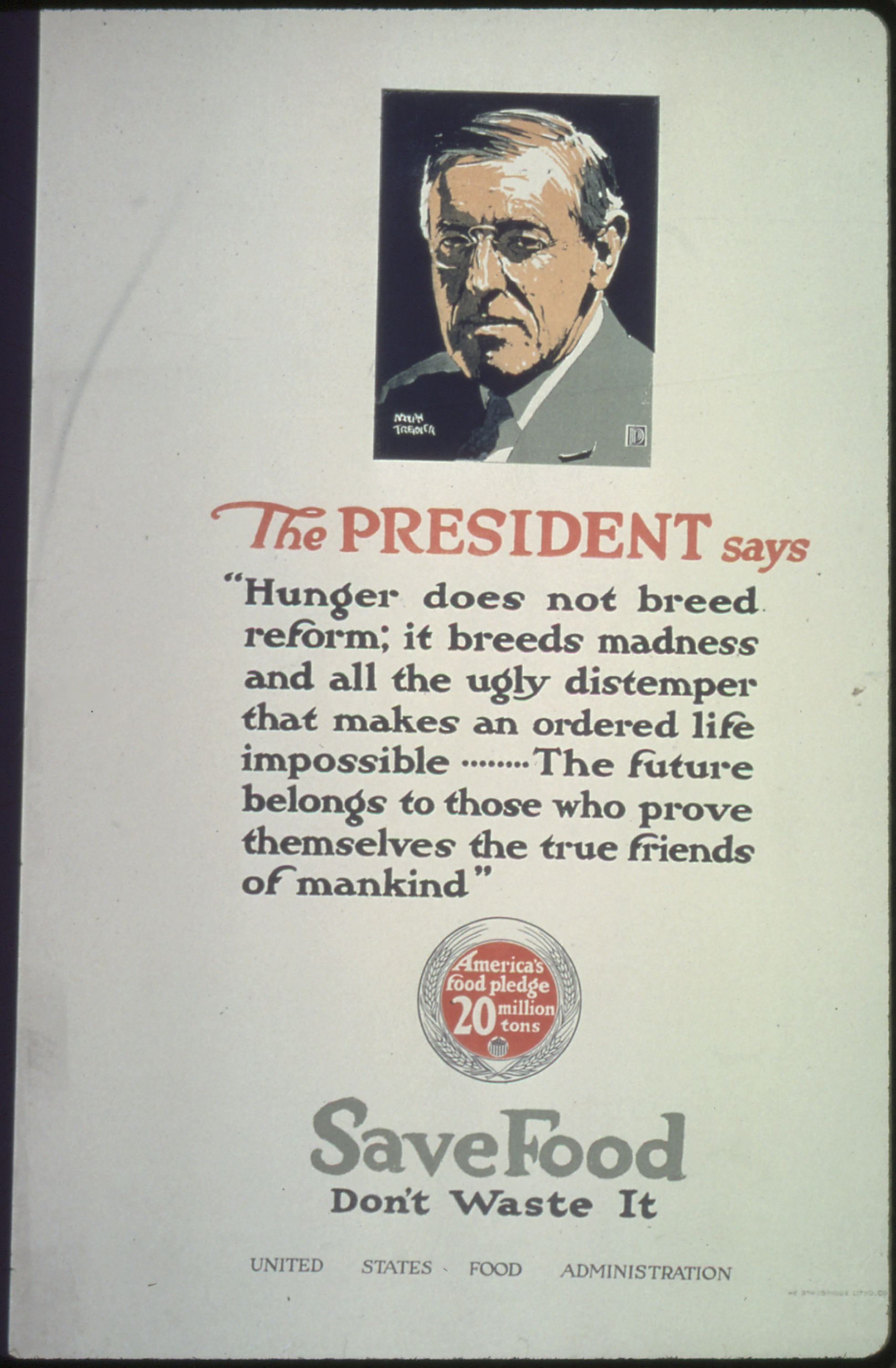
Views against hunger relief which arose first in Britain had spread all over the world due to the UK's cultural influence in the 19th century. Even as late as the First World War, US propaganda posters for food aid would sometimes refute those earlier views.

Liberal economists, such as Adam Smith, took the view that government intervention would be counterproductive; that in the long run only the free market could produce sustained plenty for all. Other very different but allied views for opposing hunger relief which arose in the late 18th century included Malthus's position that starvation was the only reliable way to check runaway population growth, and Townsend's view that hunger was a useful motivational condition, which taught "decency and civility, obedience and subjection, to the most brutish, the most obstinate, and the most perverse."

The growing movement against hunger relief was supported even by some evangelical Christians, who had come to view hunger as evidence of punishment for sin, with the hungry best left to redeem themselves through their own hard work. Until the early 1830s, Lord Pitt and others who favoured government intervention largely retained control over policy, even if they had to compromise with those who opposed generous relief measures.

But in 1834, most forms of aid to the poor were abolished, and this was done with almost universal support from the intellectual classes, even from the progressive wing. Karl Polanyi writes that the reason for the broad support was that the leading form of aid in the early 19th century, the Speenhamland system had become detested even by the working class themselves. Speenhamland involved supplementary payments to top up wages. Previously, levels of pay were often linked to the quality of the workman's work. With Speenhamland, workers would receive a guaranteed amount; it would sometimes vary, but only with the price of food. With the guaranteed payment, workers would usually find themselves dropping their standards, even if they had previously taken great pride in their workmanship. In some areas, only a small number of the very best workers were able to avoid applying for Speenhamland assistance. A saying arose among the working class that "Once on the rates, always on the rates", and the system became increasingly disliked as it was blamed for causing dependency, discouraging good work and was widely perceived to be more helpful to landowners than to workers. For this reason, by the 1830s even progressive intellectuals and opinion formers had switched their views in favour of free-market thinking.

Polyanyi records that apart from a few aristocrats whose continued support of Speenhamland could be dismissed as self-interested (the system helped workers pay high prices for food from the agricultural lands they controlled), the only well known Briton to remain prominently opposed to the free market in the early 1830s was the socialist Robert Owen. In 1832, free-market supporters seized political power, and two years later Speenhamland was abolished with the Poor Law Amendment Act 1834. Other forms of aid for the poor, even soup kitchens and handouts of food from concerned nobles and clerics, were made illegal. With a few exceptions, the only legally available form of aid was the workhouse. Workhouses became far more common after 1834, and conditions were made much harsher. The principle of "less eligibility" was established; it held that less food should be available to inmates than they could get outside even with the lowest paid available jobs, and in practice this sometimes meant they were starved.

James Vernon, in his Hunger: A Modern History (2007), wrote that while the idea that hunger relief is undesirable first became prominent in Britain, it was also here that the view was first successfully challenged. The 1834 New Poor Law became unpopular with the working class as soon as it came into force, and to a degree they formed an alliance with some of the paternalistic members of the upper class, against the free market favouring middle classes. From as early as 1834, The Times labelled The New Poor Law the "starvation law", and they ran frequent articles over the following years showing the number of British people who starved to death because of it (which happened both in the workhouses themselves and outside, because workhouses had such a dark reputation that many would prefer either to become prostitutes or to starve to death rather than enter one). Vernon writes that by the 1840s, new journalistic techniques were beginning to make emotive appeals to readers which drove home the pain experienced by those suffering from severe hunger. The new journalism began to dispel the older late 18th-century view that hunger is a sign of moral failing, instead convincing the public of sufferers "moral innocence as victims of forces beyond their control".

The new journalism in part led to a resurgence of the view that society should try to assist those suffering from hunger. Whereas older hunger relief had generally been undertook locally and on a personal level, now new efforts began to arise to tackle hunger on a national and international scale. However, it was not until the end of the 19th century that this new view became dominant - the free market view remained ascendant among Britain's governing classes for most of the 19th century, resulting in part in the refusal to send adequate food aid to mitigate the Great Famine in Ireland and to famines in India. Lord Clarendon, the Lord Lieutenant of Ireland, wrote, "I don't think there is another legislature in Europe that would disregard such suffering." On the other hand, free-market supporters had campaigned against the Corn Laws – measures which protected mostly upper-class landlords against competition from cheaper foreign imports, but which made food more expensive, contributing to the famine in Ireland. The Corn Laws were repealed in 1846, but this was too late to make much difference to the famine, in part as its abolition did not become fully effective for several years.

By the early 20th century, the stigma of hunger had been almost entirely dispelled. The public had become much more sympathetic to those suffering from the condition, in part due to the high impact journalism of people like Vaughan Nash, Henry Nevinson and Henry Brailsford. In 1905, the UK saw its first hunger march, and also in the early 20th century people even began to deliberately make themselves hungry in order to attract attention to their political causes, such as early suffragettes who pioneered the practice of hunger strikes within the UK.

== See also ==
- United Kingdom cost-of-living crisis
- Food waste in the United Kingdom
- Food banks
- 2012 Olympic hunger summit
- Kids Company
- Fareshare
- Poverty in the United Kingdom
- United Kingdom government austerity programme
