= The Real Junk Food Project =

British food organisation

The Real Junk Food Project (TRJFP) is a British organisation that uses food that would otherwise have been discarded from supermarkets, restaurants, and other independent food suppliers to produce meals that are sold in its cafes and other food outlets. TRJFP aims to raise awareness of the huge amount of food waste in the food system. A pay what you want approach aims to make its food accessible to everyone. The project was founded by Adam Smith in Leeds in 2013.

It originally included food that had past its use-by-date, but since 2017 it has said it no longer does so in preparing meals for the public.

== Cafes ==
The first Real Junk Food Project cafe was started in Armley, Leeds, in December 2013 by Sam Joseph, Conor Walsh and Adam Smith. Since its opening, this cafe has fed over 10,000 people using over 20 tonnes of unwanted food.

The Project now has a network of cafes, which are staffed by volunteers. As of 2015 there were more than 100 throughout the UK, including in Bristol, Brighton and Hove and Manchester.

== No longer serves food past its use-by date ==
During an inspection of its Leeds warehouse by West Yorkshire Trading Standards, 444 out-of-date items were found. The project was at risk of prosecution for infringing the Food Safety and Hygiene Regulations while serving produce past their expiration date. Adam Smith argued that one million people had been fed by the project without anyone becoming sick. As a response to the matter, Feedback, another UK organisation rescuing food waste, expressed support for The Real Junk Food Project by stating that "the real crime here is the waste that is caused when people throw perfectly edible food away".

The Project said it would "no longer provide food past its use-by date to the public."

== Awards ==
- 2017: The Real Junk Food Project in Birmingham, Manchester and Northampton were runners-up in the Observer Food Monthly Awards
- 2018: The Real Junk Food Project in Manchester, Leeds and Birmingham were runners-up in the Observer Food Monthly Awards
- 2018: The Brighton cafes won two golds and a silver in the Brighton and Hove Food and Drink Awards.
- 2018: Runner-up in The Food Chain's 2018 Global Food Champion Award in the BBC Food and Farming Awards.

== See also ==
- Food waste in the United Kingdom
