= Food waste in the United Kingdom =

Overview of food wastage in the United Kingdom

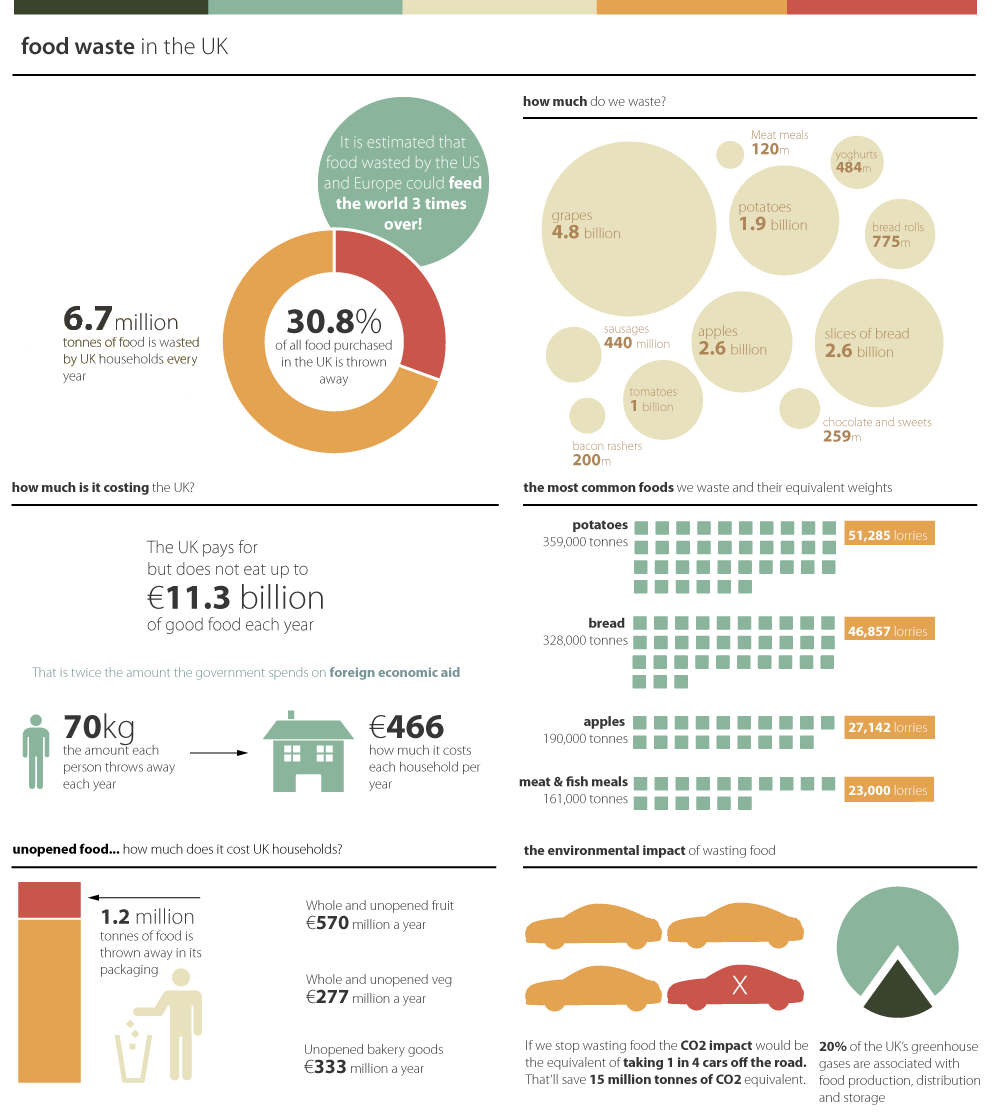

Food waste in the United Kingdom is a subject of environmental, and socioeconomic concern that has received widespread media coverage and been met with varying responses from government. Since 1915, food waste has been identified as a considerable problem and has been the subject of ongoing media attention, intensifying with the launch of the "Love Food, Hate Waste" campaign in 2007. Food waste has been discussed in newspaper articles, news reports and television programmes, which have increased awareness of it as a public issue. To tackle waste issues, encompassing food waste, the government-funded "Waste & Resources Action Programme" (WRAP) was created in 2000.

A significant proportion of food waste is produced by the domestic household, which in 2022, created 6.4 million tonnes of food waste (95kg or £250 per person); most of this was made up of salads and fresh vegetables. A majority of food waste food is avoidable,^{[d]} with the rest being divided almost equally into foods which are unavoidable, due to being inedible (e.g. tea bags) and those that are unavoidable due to preference (e.g. bread crusts) or cooking type (e.g. potato skins).

Reducing the amount of food waste has been deemed critical if the UK is to meet international targets on climate change, limiting greenhouse gas emissions, and obligations under the European Landfill Directive to reduce biodegradable waste going to landfill. Equally great emphasis has been placed on the reduction of food waste as a means of ending hunger. In the context of the 2007–2008 world food price crisis, food waste was discussed at the 34th G8 summit in Hokkaidō, Japan. The then UK Prime Minister Gordon Brown said of the issue: "We must do more to deal with unnecessary demand, such as by all of us doing more to cut our food waste".

In June 2009, the Environment Secretary Hilary Benn announced the Government's "War on waste", a programme aimed at reducing Britain's food waste. The proposed plans under the scheme included: scrapping best before and limiting sell by labels on food, creating new food packaging sizes, constructing more "on-the-go" recycling points and unveiling five flagship anaerobic digestion plants. Two years after its launch, the "Love Food, Hate Waste" campaign was claiming it had already prevented 137,000 tonnes of waste and, through the help it had given to over 2,000,000 households, had made savings of £300,000,000. Successive governments have continued to tackle food waste in the UK, with a number of objectives specified in the December 2018 "Resources and Waste Strategy" and in 2023 the UK became part of the UN Food System Summit Coalition, that seeks to half the amount of global food waste by 2030. By the end of March 2026, weekly food waste collections had been introduced by most councils, as a result of government policy, with exceptions occurring when existing waste contracts prevented this being possible.

== History ==
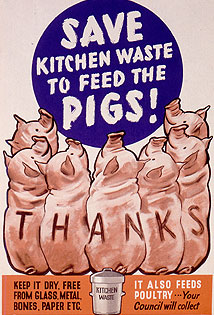
During World War II, posters advised on a number of issues, including that of food waste.

=== Early 20th century ===
Food waste was identified as a problem in the UK as early as World War I. Combating food waste was one of the initial goals of the Women's Institutes (WI), set up in 1915, and remains a subject of their campaigns. Rationing was adopted during World War I, although it was voluntary, from February 1917; it was only between December 1917 and February 1918 that rationing began, in stages, to be made compulsory. Furthermore, there is no evidence to suggest that by 1918 fines were imposed on either individuals or businesses for wasting food. Meanwhile, in the United States (where shortages were hardly comparable), legislators considered laws restricting the distribution of food in order to cut waste, breaches of which might be punishable by fines or imprisonment.

During World War II, rationing was imposed almost immediately. Restrictions were immediately more stringent than in World War I: with effect from 8 January 1940, ration books were issued and most foods were subject to ration. By August 1940, food waste was an imprisonable offence under the law. Posters encouraged kitchen waste to be used for feeding animals, primarily swine but also poultry.

=== Late 20th century ===
Many of the methods suggested by current campaigns to prevent food waste have taken inspiration from those of World War II. Despite this, it remains debatable whether the waste campaigns and rationing, during and post-WWII, achieved any long-term change in people's attitudes towards waste; WRAP's 2007 report on domestic household waste found that older people generate as much avoidable waste as younger people. Further, as early as 1980, only twenty-five years after rationing was fully abolished, a journal article published that year found significant levels of waste at home, in restaurants and in sectors of the food industry. However, the rising amount of food waste could also be attributed to a change of lifestyle, for instance the buying of produce which has a shorter shelf life; which would involuntarily lead to more food being thrown away.

By the late 1990s, things had worsened, and the food manufacturing sector was estimated to be generating over 8,000,000 tonnes of food waste annually. A documentary in 1998 revealed tonnes of edible food being discarded at a Tesco store, provoking a renewed response on the issue of food waste.

=== Early 21st century ===
In 2000, the UK Government created the Waste & Resources Action Programme (WRAP), a government-funded, not-for-profit company that advises on how to reduce waste and use resources efficiently. In 2007, WRAP launched the "Love Food, Hate Waste" campaign and returned food waste to the forefront of the news and public agenda. Two years later, the "Love Food, Hate Waste" campaign claimed to have prevented 137,000 tonnes of waste being sent to landfill and saved £300,000,000.

In 2005, facing "limited information about the amounts and types of food waste produced", WRAP launched a "major research programme" which would lead to the publishing of "The food we waste report" on 8 May 2008. Believed at the time to be "the first of its kind in the world", the report interviewed 2,175 householders and collected waste from 2,138 of them.

If we are to get food prices down, we must do more to deal with unnecessary demand, such as by all of us doing more to cut our food waste which is costing the average household in Britain around £8 per week.

— Gordon Brown speaking to journalists shortly before attending the 34th G8 Summit, The Independent, July 2008

Since the developments of 2007–08, food waste has continued to be a subject of attention, discussed in almost every major UK newspaper, often with issues such as climate change and famine in African nations. To reduce the impact of the aforementioned, food waste has been among the topics of discussion at recent International Summits; food waste was debated during the 34th G8 summit in Hokkaidō, Japan, as part of the discussion on the 2007–2008 world food price crisis.

In June 2009, Environment Secretary Hilary Benn announced the "War on waste", new government plans aimed at reducing Britain's food waste. It was planned to remove "best before" labels and limit the "sell by" labels on foods. New food packaging sizes are planned to be introduced, coming as EU rules on packaging sizes are lifted and people are increasingly living alone. Five flagship anaerobic digestion plants with "cutting-edge technology" were to be built before the end of March 2011; they would together receive a grant of £10,000,000 from WRAP's "Anaerobic Digestion Demonstration Programme". Liz Goodwin, WRAP Chief Executive Officer, said of the five projects: "These projects are truly ground-breaking. Between them, they demonstrate how anaerobic digestion can help the UK efficiently meet the challenges of reducing carbon emissions and improving sustainable food production."

The UK Government's "Resources and Waste Strategy", published in December 2018, set out current government policy on "how we will preserve our stock of material resources by minimising waste, promoting resource efficiency and moving towards a circular economy". In relation to food waste, chapter 5 of the strategy set out objectives to:

- redistribute surplus food more effectively to those who need it most, before it can go to waste
- consult on annual reporting of food surplus and waste generated by larger food businesses
- consult on legal powers to introduce mandatory food waste targets and surplus food redistribution obligations
- publish a new food surplus and waste hierarchy
- promote awareness of the food waste issue by appointing a new food waste champion, and
- support cross sector collaboration through the Courtauld 2025 commitment.

In 2018, Ben Elliot was appointed by Michael Gove, then the Secretary of State for Environment, as the government's first Food Surplus and Waste Champion. He stepped down in 2022.

In 2023, the UK government joined the UN Food System Summit Coalition, with the aim of halving global food waste by 2030.

Reducing food waste in the UK is a key aim of the think tank The Food Policy Institute

The "Simper Recycling in England" policy update, published by the UK Government in November 2024, aimed to simplify household and workplace recycling, including for food waste, standardising what can be recycled across England and stipulated the requirement for local authorities to provide weekly food waste collections for households by the 31 March 2026, unless prevented to do so by an existing waste disposal contract.

== Causes ==
In 2021, WRAP noted that total food waste in the UK was at 10.7 million tonnes, with about 60% of this coming from households, 28% coming from farming and manufacturing, hospitality making up approximately 10% and retail contributing 3%; WRAP also noted that the figures had been going down for 10 years, but had started to rise again during Covid.

Other surveys noted that domestic food waste had gone down during the pandemic as most people used up more food to avoid going outside to busy shops; however, farming waste may have gone up due to the shutdown of cafes and restaurants.

=== 2007 ===
==== Households ====
Domestic food waste in the UK in 2007
| Category | England | Wales | Scotland | N. Ireland | UK |
|---|---|---|---|---|---|
| Household waste (1000s of tonnes) | 25,688 | 1,585 | 2,276 | 919 | 30,468 |
| Composition of food Waste (% household) | 17.5% | 18%^{[a]} | 18%^{[b]} | 19%^{[c]} | 17.6% |
| Quantity of food waste (1000s of tonnes) | 4,495 | 285 | 410 | 184 | 5,375 |

The single largest producer of food waste in the United Kingdom is the domestic household. In 2007, households created 6,700,000 tonnes of food waste - accounting for 19 per cent of all municipal solid waste.

- In 2007, potatoes accounted for the largest quantity of avoidable^{[d]} food disposed of; 359,000 tonnes per year were thrown away, 49 per cent (177,400 tonnes) of which were untouched.
- Bread slices accounted for the second food type most disposed of (328,000 tonnes per year)
- Apples were the third (190,000 tonnes per year).
- Salad was disposed of in the greatest proportion: 45 per cent of all salad purchased by weight were thrown away uneaten.

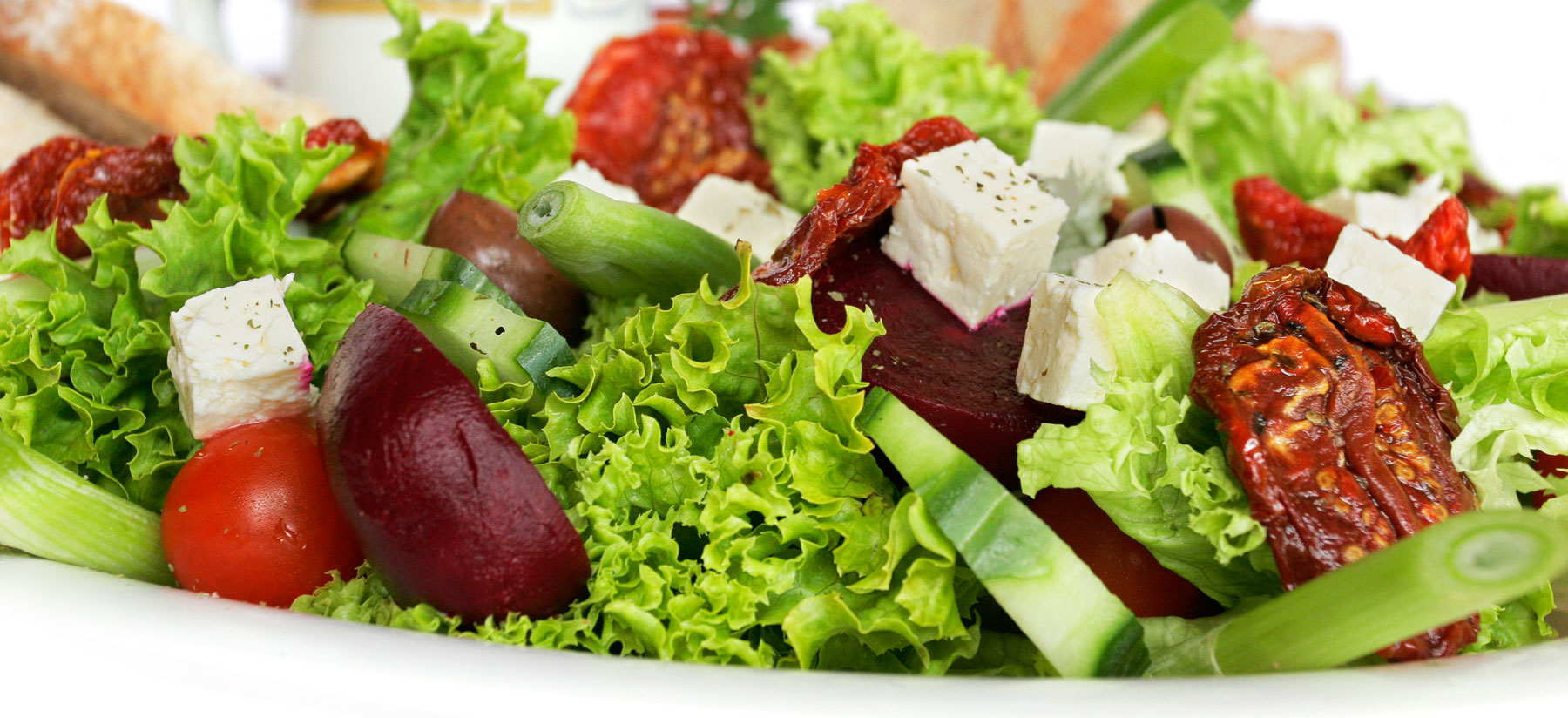
Salads are the food type thrown away in greatest proportion – more than 45% of all purchased will be wasted.

Much of the food thrown away could have been avoided (4,100,000 tonnes, 61 per cent of the total amount of food waste) and with better management could have been eaten or used. Unavoidable foods, such as vegetable peelings and tea bags, account for 19 per cent of the total, with the remaining 20 per cent being unavoidable through preferences (e.g. bread crusts) and cooking types (e.g. potato skins). However in 2007, the vast majority of consumers (90%) were unaware of the amount of food they throw away; individuals who believed that their household wasted no food were shown to be throwing away 88 kg of avoidable food per year.

The amount of food waste produced by a household and its occupants was affected by several factors; WRAP found the most important factors to be:

1. The size of the household,
2. The age of the individual occupants,
3. The household composition (e.g. single occupant household).

The other factors (job status, lifestage, ethnicity and occupation grouping of individuals) were found to have less correlation with the amount of avoidable waste.

Regarding household size, the relationship was not proportional (two occupants do not dispose of twice as much food waste as one occupant):

- Single-occupancy households, on average, threw away 3.2 kilograms (7.1 lb): per week the least food waste by weight but the most proportionately. This disproportional wastage was partially attributed to food packaging sizes being largely inappropriate for people living on their own.
- Families with children (under the age of 16), on a per household per week basis, were shown to waste the most food by weight (7.3 kilograms (16 lb)); when calculated per individual, however, members of a family that included children wasted the least food (1.8 kilograms (4.0 lb)).
- Contrary to both previous research and conventional wisdom, the report discovered that older people wasted as much avoidable food as younger people (1.2 kg per person per week); in terms of mean average cost and weight of food waste, older people did waste less, although for retired households this may have been because they are smaller.

==== Retailers ====
Other sectors also contribute to food waste. The food industry produces large amounts of food waste, with retailers alone generating 1,600,000 tonnes of food waste in 2008. Supermarkets were particularly criticised for wasting items which were damaged or unsold (what the industry calls 'surplus food'), but that often remained edible. However, exact statistics for the amount of food wasted by supermarkets were mostly unavailable; although a few voluntarily release data on food waste, it is not required by law. Similarly, limited information is available on amounts generated by the agricultural sector. Before a reversal of European Union policy in 2008, which came into effect on 1 July 2009, misshaped or 'wonky' fruit and vegetables could not be sold by retailers and were required to be thrown away.

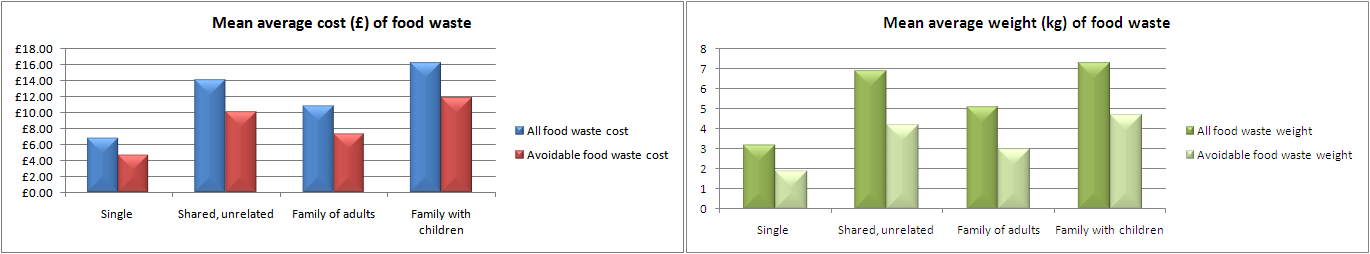
Graphs showing the mean average cost and weight of food waste by household composition. Source: WRAP, the Food we waste Report 2007

=== 2021-2024 ===
By 2021, it was estimated that 30% of food waste was inedible; however, edible food waste was worth approximately £17 billion pounds, or £250 per person. In 2022, domestic food waste in the UK was at 6.4 million tonnes.

By 2024, bread (900,000 tonnes) and potatoes (700,000 tonnes) were still the biggest source of household food waste in the UK; these were followed by milk, left-overs, drinks, pork, poultry, carrots and chips (fries). Lettuce and fruit were also seen high on the list.

In 2024, a survey by Food Manufacture magazine showed that more than half of British people aged over 55 would keep food past its best-before, while only a quarter of under-25s did so; the under-25s claimed to much less confidence about their knowledge of food storage methods.

By 2024, the retail sector was estimated to waste 270,000 tonnes of food each year; legislation in England and Scotland is in place which requires companies to separate and recycle food waste, and several national supermarkets, including Aldi and Iceland have signed up to the Courtauld Commitment.

The hospitality industry was recognised as a large part of the food waste issue, with over one million tonnes coming from this sector; in response, WRAP created an initiative called Guardians of Grub to help restaurants and cafés to save food and money.

== Impact ==
Food waste puts a large burden on the finances of each household and local councils in the UK; wasted food is estimated to cost each British household £250–400 per year, accumulating to £15,000–24,000 over a lifetime. This comes from the total purchasing cost of the food against what is thrown away uneaten. Additionally, households pay for the collection and disposal of food waste by their local council in the form of council tax. For councils, the cost of food waste comes from its collection and disposal as a part of the waste stream; this is especially an issue for councils that run separate food waste collections.

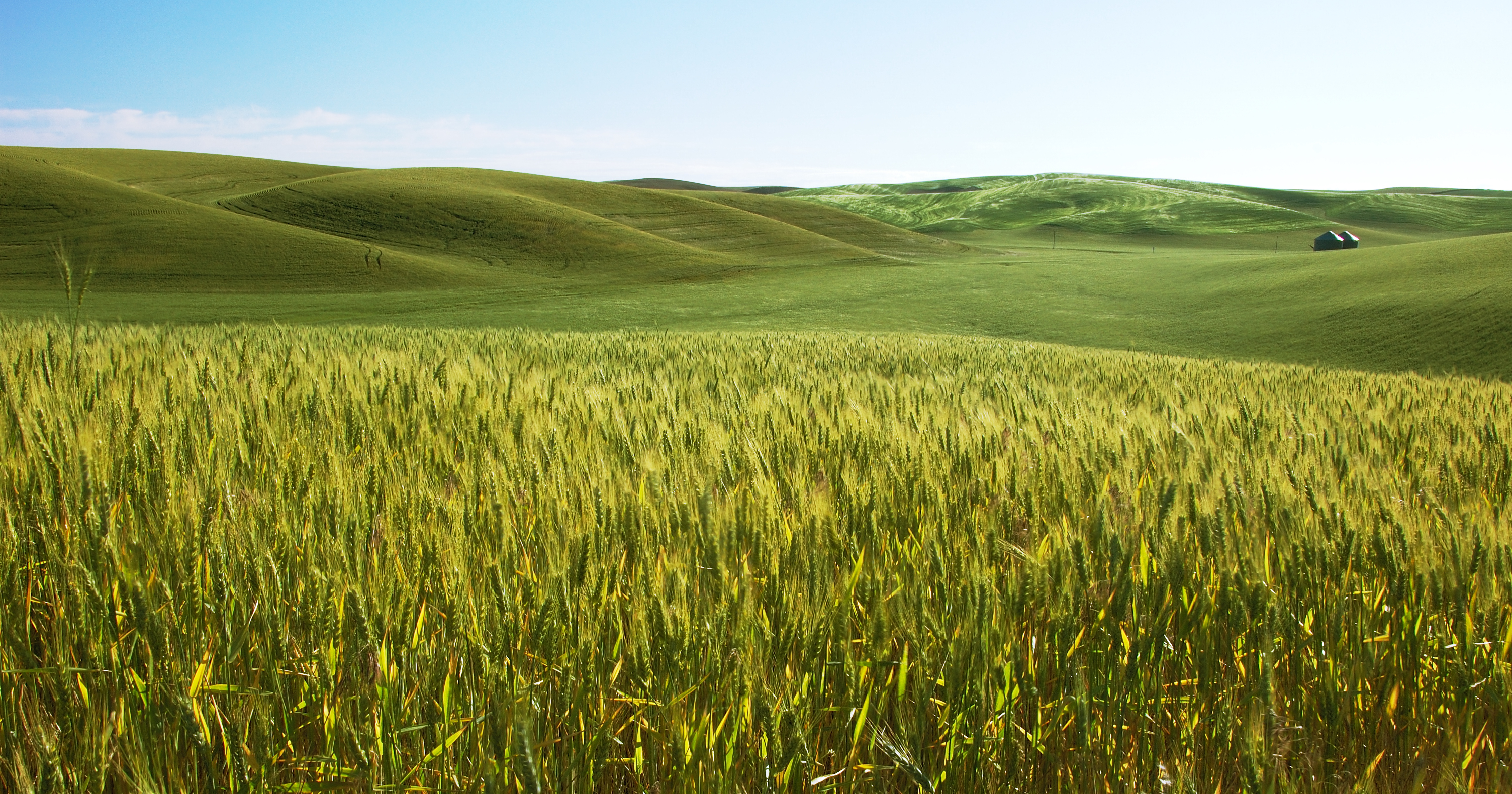
A UNEP report found that, by increasing efficiency, current food production could feed the planet's projected population as well as help protect the environment.

Food waste is generally considered to have a damaging effect on the environment; a reduction in food waste is considered critical if the UK is to meet obligations under the European Landfill Directive to reduce biodegradable waste going to landfill and favourable considering international targets on climate change, limiting greenhouse gas emissions. When disposed of in landfill, food waste releases methane, a relatively damaging greenhouse gas, and leachate, a toxin capable of considerable groundwater pollution. The food supply chain accounts for a fifth of UK carbon emissions; the production, storage and transportation of food to homes requires large amounts of energy. The effects of stopping food waste that can potentially be prevented has been likened to removing one in five cars from UK roads.

Internationally, food waste's effect on the environment has been an issue. Ireland is facing fines of millions of euros if the amount of biodegradable waste it sends to landfill does not fall below the maximum quantity set by the European Union's Landfill Directive. By 2010, the same directive will impose fines of £40m a year across England, rising to £205m by 2013, if its own targets on biodegradable municipal waste are not met; the amount of biodegradable municipal waste being sent to landfill in 2010 must be 75% of that sent in 1995, by 2013 it must be 50% and by 2020 it must be 35%.

In the context of the 2007–2008 world food price crisis and potential food shortages, food waste is an important and impacting issue. The United Nations Environment Programme (UNEP) identified food waste as being a critical problem, a view shared by a Cabinet Office report on food; it said that doing nothing to solve it would lead to severe food shortages, which may trigger food price climbs of up to 50%. With a third of food purchased in the UK never eaten, the country was singled out in the report. UNEP Executive Director Achim Steiner said that: "Over half of the food produced today is either lost, wasted or discarded as a result of inefficiency in the human-managed food chain. There is evidence within the report [The Environmental Food crises: Environment's role in averting future food crises] that the world could feed the entire projected population growth alone by becoming more efficient while also ensuring the survival of wild animals, birds and fish on this planet."

== Response ==
=== Prevention ===
Reasons for food waste in 2007
| Reason for disposal | Proportion by weight |
|---|---|
| Inedible | 36.5% |
| Left on plate | 15.7% |
| Out of date | 15.1% |
| Mouldy | 9.3% |
| Looked bad | 8.8% |
| Smelt/tasted bad | 4.5% |
| Left from cooking | 4% |
| Other | 3.8% |
| In fridge/cupboard too long | 1.5% |

Reasons for food waste in 2024
| Reason for disposal | Responses |
|---|---|
| Need to replace items | 45% |
| Due to best-before date | 29% |
| Don’t have time to use up leftovers | 20% |
| Don’t need to use up leftovers due to eating out | 19% |
| Due to display-to date | 14% |
| Due to sell-by date | 11% |

To reduce the food waste produced (often unintentionally or unavoidably, due to lifestyle) by consumers, advisory campaigns and articles have put forward varying advice and suggestions. The following strategies: planning before food shopping, understanding food date labels and using leftovers in other meals, are universally agreed to be effective in preventing food waste. Planning, before food shopping, and knowing what purchases are necessary is among ways of reducing food waste; buy one, get one free (BOGOF) offers have been criticised for encouraging customers to purchase food items that are eventually thrown away; as part of its own campaign on food waste, supermarket retailer Morrisons planned to offer "One Free to Freeze" as a replacement for BOGOFs, with hopes that these promotions will encourage customers to plan ahead.

Understanding food storage and food date labels is an important, but currently problematic, measure; in 2008, research by the Food Standards Agency (FSA) showed that food dates were poorly understood by consumers; only 36 per cent of people interpreted a best before date as a use by date and only 55 per cent correctly interpreted use by dates.^{[e]} Food date labels are planned to undergo radical changes as part of the "War on waste".

Leftover foods can and are encouraged to be used in other meals. Currently this is not widely undertaken due to a "lack of confidence". Specialist cookbooks and waste campaigns include recipes which are designed to incorporate typical leftovers and require minimal cooking skill.

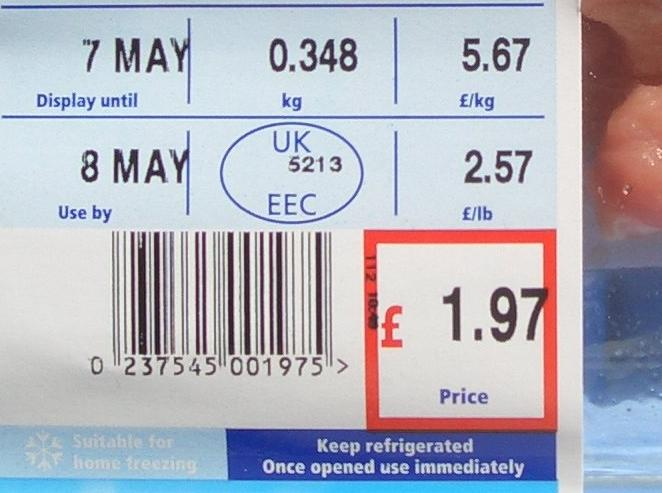
Date labels on foods will change, as part of the 'War on waste' announced in 2009, with the intent of reducing food waste.

Sectors of the food industry (manufacturing and retail) have pledged to reduce the amount of food they directly waste, and additionally what they cause households to waste indirectly. This is planned to happen through a combination of: effective labeling, pack size range, storage advice and packaging that extends the duration of food freshness. An initiative launched in May 2009 was seen as an expansion to ongoing attempts to reduce the wider food packaging. The aim was to cut UK household food waste by 155,000 tonnes (2.5% of total waste) before the end of 2010 by helping UK households prevent food going to waste.

Food charities, the most widely known being FareShare, arrange the distribution of surplus food from the food industry among disadvantaged people in the community. In 2020 FareSHare reported that they had used 26,000 tonnes of ‘surplus food’ in one year, enough for 57 million meals; however this was only 1% of surplus food wasted in the UK that year.

=== Collection ===
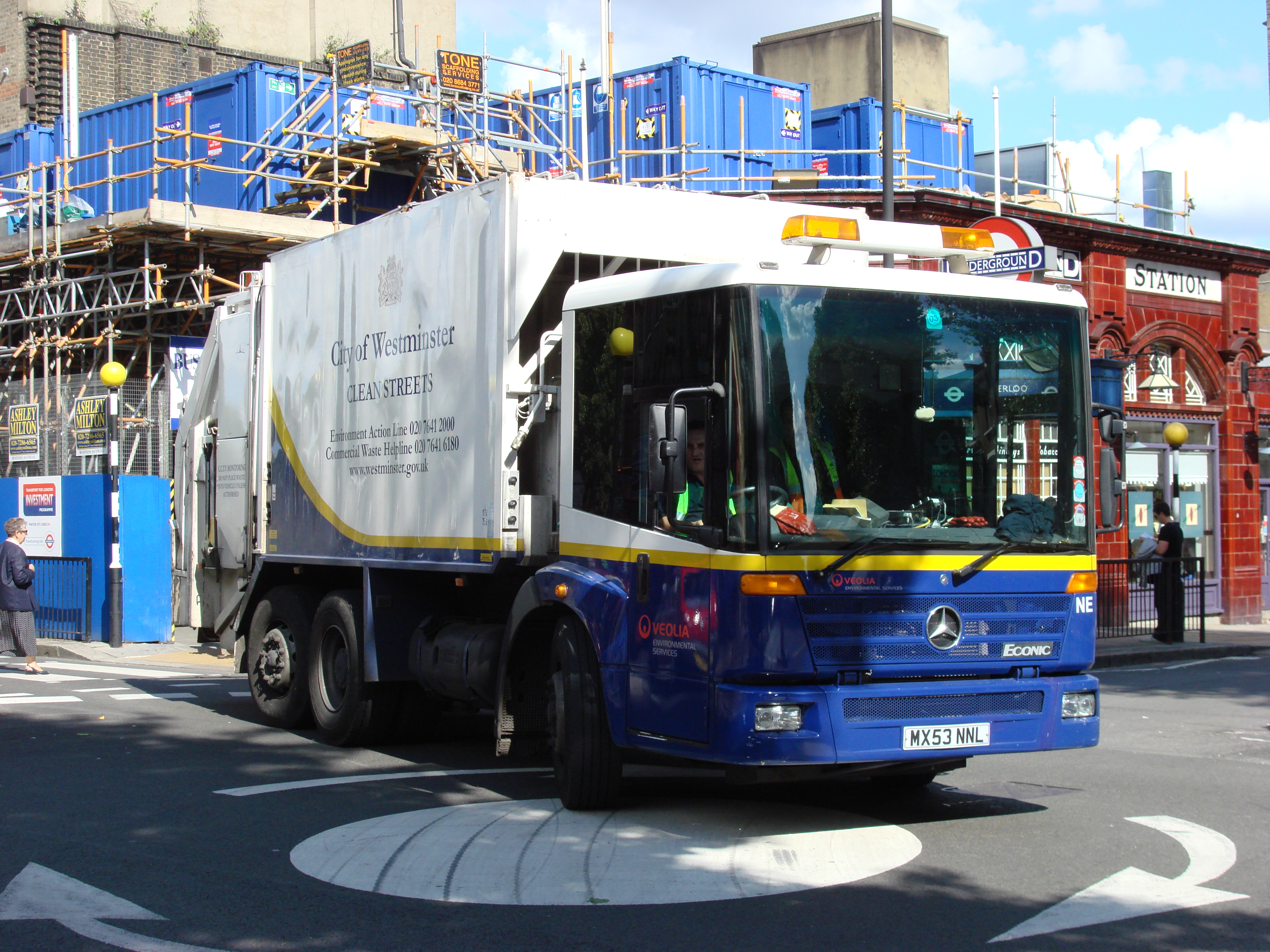
Separate collection of food waste uses existing transport and infrastructure, as pictured.

The majority of UK authorities (some have varying or specific policy) collect food waste together with municipal waste; estimates made in 2007 put the amount of food waste collected separately, for either composting or anaerobic digestion, at only 2% of what is available. Where food waste is collected separately, it is usually incorporated into an existing garden waste collection. If applicable, separate collections for garden and food waste typically run on intervening fortnightly weeks to those of municipal waste and share infrastructure and transport.

It has been suggested that given its proportion of the waste stream and the lack of distinct collections, food waste is not currently being targeted appropriately. However proposals by the European Union, which would require local authorities to provide separate collection of food and garden waste, have been met with opposition; critics of the proposals argue that local authorities understand the specific needs of the areas they serve, and that they should decide waste policy. Advocates of the proposals say that it will ensure energy is not wasted in sorting biodegradable waste from other materials.

Figures from WRAP revealed the most efficient method of collecting food waste to be separate collections, followed by mixed green and food waste on a weekly basis. A mixed fortnightly collection was shown to be the worst performing. This was considered confirmation of earlier suspicions that, if carried out correctly, separate collections can result in less wastage of biodegradable waste. A widespread pilot scheme for separate food waste collection, involving nineteen English local authorities, achieved success and 'high levels of satisfaction' from households. In 2024 the government stipulated that councils across the UK must provide a weekly food waste collection by the end of Q1 2026, unless a waste contract stopped this being possible.

One option for separating food waste at source is the in-sink food-waste disposer (FWD). It was invented in 1928 and is used in 50% of households in the US, 34% in New Zealand, 20% in Australia and increasingly in some European countries, notably Sweden. A FWD has no blades or knives, it has a grind chamber, the floor of which is a spinning disc with lugs spin the waste against the perforated wall of the chamber, particles exit when they are small enough. measured particle size distribution and found 98% <2mm. They also measured settleability and found the ground waste would be carried/resuspended easily in conventionally designed sewers. estimated the Global Warming Potentials (100 year) of options for food waste management were landfill +740 kgCO_{2}e/t food waste, incineration +13, centralised composting -14 and that anaerobic digestion was about -170 kgCO_{2}e/t food waste whether it was kerbside collected and transported by truck or FWD to sewer to AD at a wastewater treatment works. In a follow-up paper, analysed data from Surahammar, Sweden comparing the time when there were no FWD with the present when 50% of households have FWD. This study verified laboratory etc. work published earlier by other workers. They found there was no increase in wastewater treatment works' cost, nor the volume of wastewater but that there was a 46% increase in biogas.

=== Disposal ===
Food waste remains primarily disposed to landfill (54 per cent of total municipal waste was disposed of in this way in 2007/8),^{[f]} although year-on-year the amount being sent to landfill is decreasing.

In 2024, all areas of the UK had plans in place to legally restrict the sending of biodegradable waste to landfill.

Composting, the purposeful biodegradation of organic matter by microorganisms, is among the most simple ways of treating food waste and thereby preventing it being sent to landfill. Since all biodegradable materials will eventually oxidise to become compost, the process can be undertaken at home with no running costs, although equipment can accelerate the process. Most components of food waste are putrescibles^{[g]} and will be broken down in a compost, however some exceptions will not (e.g. cooked foods and feces) and can attract vermin. The effectiveness of composting food waste depends on the available space (or storage capacity in the case of a compost bin) and the method of composting. Unlike in landfill, where it is mixed with other (non-biodegradable) materials, food waste decomposing in a compost does not release harmful gases. Similarly to compost created from other waste sources, composted food waste can be used to return nutrients to the soil if spread on the garden (see uses of compost).

Anaerobic digestion (AD), the breaking down of biodegradable material by microorganisms in the absence of oxygen, is recognised as an effective method of waste disposal, with the potential to address the food waste problem nationally. AD technology has a small environmental impact, producing less greenhouse gas emissions than composting. However, although the process is well established in the water industry, it is less so within the waste sector. Despite this, the AD industry is being (and planned to be further) expanded by local councils and retailers to deal with food waste; several local authorities in the UK are planning to build anaerobic digestion plants, with the largest, to be located in Selby, due to operate from 2010. Supermarket chains Tesco and Sainsbury's are both adopting AD technology to dispose of their waste, while Tesco's head of waste and recycling said: "As renewable energy technologies now become mainstream, there is no excuse for sending waste to landfill that could actually be put to positive use." AD technology remains an experimental field though, and there is potential for advancements to increase efficiency. In July 2014 Sainsbury's began powering one of its stores using anaerobic digestion.

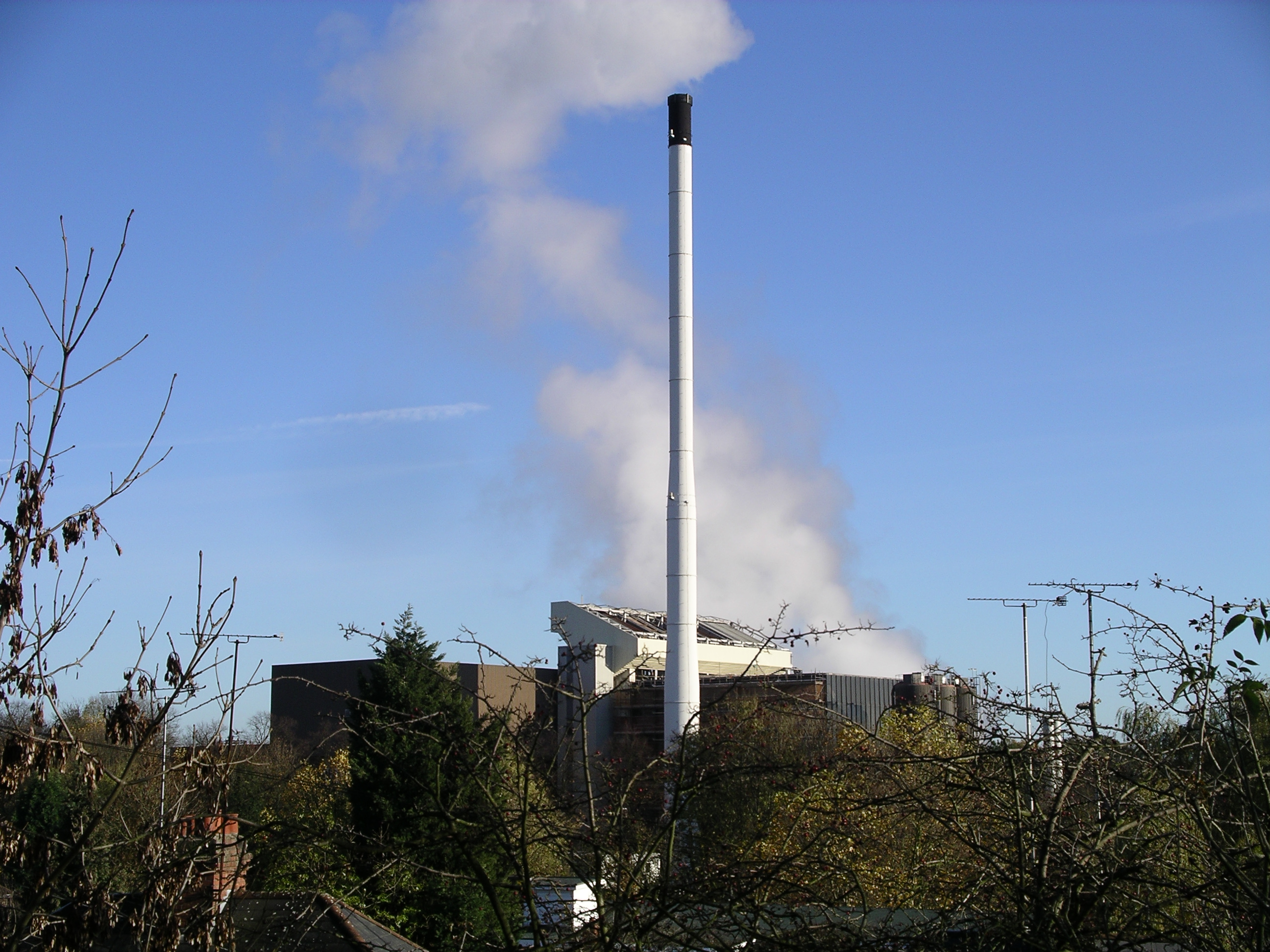
Incinerating food waste is one of several alternatives to disposing to landfill.

Incinerating waste has traditionally been viewed as a method with the main purpose being the destruction of the waste involved. Recovering the energy generated from this process has become of greater importance, and all incineration facilities in England now operate as energy-from-waste plants (with many operating as combined heat and power facilities). Critics question the safety of the pollutants emitted during the process and argue that, as incinerators require constant levels of waste to operate, it encourages more waste. However, the levels of emissions from the incinerating process has been greatly reduced by developments in technology and legislation.

In 2021, WRAP unveiled a new campaign named Food Waste Action Week; this initiative, held in mid-March each year, focuses on educating people and business on the scale of food waste, and ways to prevent this and use food more efficiently.

== See also ==
- Dumpster diving
- FareShare
- Food waste in New Zealand
- Food waste recycling in Hong Kong
- The Real Junk Food Project
- Waste treatment

== Notes ==
1. A figure of 18% for Wales is assumed by the authors; the composition of municipal waste indicates a lower figure for municipal waste (15.7%) but this included a significant proportion of non-household waste.
2. The Scottish Environment Protection Agency gives a range of figures from Scottish local authorities for putrescibles^{[g]} with an average of 28% and with an average for ‘fines’ of 7%. The authors estimated food waste at 18% of household waste.
3. Northern Ireland figures suggest a figure of 33% for all putrescibles in household waste. The authors assumed that approximately 14% would be garden waste, leaving 19% as food waste.
4. ^{a} ^{b} 'Avoidable food waste', in the context of this article, is considered to be food that, by following prevention measures, could have avoided becoming waste. Unavoidable food waste, by comparison, is food that cannot be saved from becoming waste due to its use; tea bags are unavoidably wasted because they cannot be used for other purposes. It is important to be aware that unavoidable food waste can often still be composted.
5. 'Use by' is, according to the Food Standards Agency, 'the date up to and including which food may be used safely (cooked, processed or consumed) if it has been stored correctly'. 'Best before' by comparison is the date after which the food's quality may begin to deteriorate, although in most cases (discounting eggs) it remains edible.
6. Since food waste is so rarely separated from municipal waste (only 2% was collected separately for either composting or anaerobic digestion) and comprises a significant proportion of it (around 20%), it can be assumed that the disposal of food waste follows the same trends as that of municipal waste, hence the use of Defra's municipal waste statistics.
7. ^{a} ^{b} A putrescible is commonly defined as 'a substance which is liable to undergo decomposition when in contact with air and moisture at ordinary temperatures'. Animal, fruit, and vegetable debris, and cooked food are included under this definition.
