= The Felix Project =

UK charitable organisation

The Felix Project is a United Kingdom charitable organisation that saves surplus food from suppliers and redistributes it to charities. It has the dual aims of reducing food surplus and relieving food poverty.

== Work ==
The Felix Project redistributes food that supermarkets, wholesalers and other suppliers cannot sell for a variety of reasons, ranging from seasonal gluts and packaging defects, to changes in customer orders. It sorts and delivers food, free of charge, direct to local kitchens, community halls, schools, day centres and food banks. The charities provide meals, snacks or food parcels for their clients who include the elderly, the homeless, those with mental health issues, refugees and asylum seekers, families and children.

The Waste & Resources Action Programme (abbr. WRAP) estimated that 10 million tonnes of food was thrown away in the UK in 2016. Sustain estimate 18% or one in five London pupils are at risk of hunger every day.

They collect or receive food from over 539 suppliers, which is then distributed to nearly 1000 front-line charities, schools and holiday programmes in London. In 2021, they provided food for 30,000,000 meals. As well as redistributing food, Felix's Kitchen in Poplar, East London, uses donated fresh produce to create circa 4,000 "ready meals" a day. (numbers correct as of Jan 2024)

== History ==
The Felix Project was founded in July 2016 by Justin Byam Shaw, in memory of his teenage son Felix who died suddenly from meningitis. His mother, who is a trustee of the charity, said that Felix "hated the idea of poverty and deprivation, of people or animals going hungry".

The organisation started with a van and a depot in West London. A new depot in North London opened in November 2017. In 2018, weekly food deliveries to primary schools started with Stanhope Primary School, and a green scheme for cyclists and walkers to collect and deliver food in a courier bag.

== Campaigns ==
The London Evening Standard and The Independent's 2017 Christmas Appeal raised £1,049,896 for the Felix Project's Help a Hungry Child Programme to establish 'market stalls' in primary schools, to help channel surplus food from suppliers directly to those young children and their families who are in the greatest need. The aim is to ensure no child in any primary school supported by the charity goes hungry.

56 Team Felix runners took part in The Big Half, London's new half-marathon.

Collaboration with top London chefs aims to raise the profile of high-quality gastronomy and show the value of surplus food to encourage social inclusion. This includes partnering with Refettorio Felix at St Cuthbert's Centre, a community kitchen founded by chef Massimo Bottura, and being the official charity partner for London Food Month which was attended by more than 100,000 people.

== Funding ==
The Felix Project is funded by donations from individuals, corporate supporters and the Felix Byam Shaw Foundation. The Evening Standard's Food for London campaign had The Felix Project as its flagship charity. Corporate sponsors donate vans, fridges and contribute to running costs.

Crowdfunding helped raise funds for a new depot in North London.

Department for Environment, Food and Rural Affairs awarded funding in the first round of their Food Waste Fund, which was awarded to redistribution organisations to substantially reduce food waste from businesses.

== Awards ==
2017 Beacon Award for Philanthropy, for Justin Byam Shaw, founder of The Felix Project

== See also ==
- Hunger in the United Kingdom
