= The Trussell Trust =

British food bank charity

Trussell
- The Trussell Trust
- Founded: 1997
- Founder: Paddy Henderson; Carol Henderson
- Type: NGO; Charity
- Registration no.: CCEW: 1110522; OSCR: SC044246; Company: 5434524
- Region served: United Kingdom
- Products: Food Parcels
- Method: Food banks
- Co-CEO: Emma Revie; Matthew van Duyvenbode
- Employees: 120+
- Volunteers: 28,000
- Website: trussell.org.uk

Trussell is an NGO and charity that works to end the need for food banks in the United Kingdom. It "is based on, shaped, and guided by Christian principles" and supports a network of about 1,700 food bank centres to provide emergency food and compassionate, practical support to people in crisis, while campaigning for long-term change to the structural issues that lock people into poverty. Its main office is in Salisbury, England.

== History ==
The Trussell Trust was founded in 1997 by Paddy and Carol Henderson using a legacy left by Carol's mother, Betty Trussell. Initially, the charity worked in Bulgaria to improve conditions for children sleeping at Sofia Central Railway Station. In 2000, they began to work in the UK too, opening the first food bank in their home city of Salisbury after they were contacted by a British mother who was struggling to feed her children. In 2024 the organisation changed its name to Trussell and underwent a brand refresh, although its name is still registered as the Trussell Trust in the charity and company registers.

== Work ==
=== Food banks ===
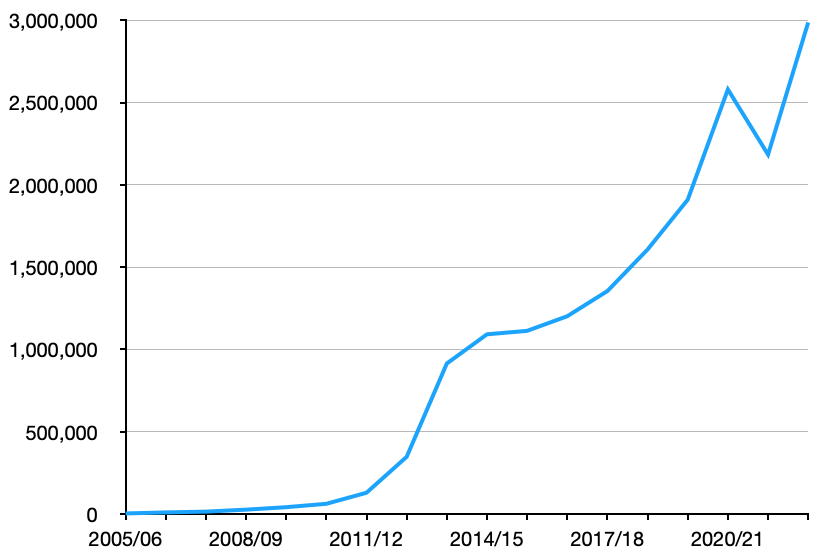
Food parcels given out by the Trussell Trust from 2005/06 to 2022/23

Emergency food parcels distributed by Trussell
Year	Parcels distributed	Percentage increase	Reference
2005–06	2,814	—N/a	
2006–07	9,174	226	
2007–08	13,849	51	
2008–09	25,899	87	
2009–10	40,898	58	
2010–11	61,468	50	
2011–12	128,697	109	
2012–13	346,992	170	
2013–14	913,138	163	
2014–15	1,084,604	19	
2015–16	1,109,954	2	
2016–17	1,182,954	7	
2017–18	1,332,952	13	
2018–19	1,606,794	19	
2019–20	1,909,388	19	
2020–21	2,579,292	35	
2021–22	2,183,625	−15	
2022–23	2,986,203	37	
2023–24	3,121,404	5	
2024–25	2,885,086	−8	

In the period April 2024 through March 2025, Trussell operated out of 1,711 total (Note: Not all centres may have been open at the same time, nor at the end of the year.) food bank centres across the UK, providing emergency food and support to people locked in poverty. Food bank centres in the Trussell Trust network account for roughly two-thirds of all emergency food bank provision in the UK.

In 2018–19, food banks in the Trussell Trust's network distributed 1.6 million food bank parcels to people in crisis – a 19% increase on the previous year. Over half a million of these parcels went to children. In the period 2014–2019, Trussell food bank usage increased by 74%.

The top cited reasons for needing to access Trussell's food banks in 2018–19 were: "income not covering essential costs", "benefit delays", and "benefit changes".

Food banks react to the needs of their local community to provide help and support to people in crisis. Therefore the services provided by food banks vary from area to area. Generally, donations by the public are collected at a range of places such as schools, faith groups and businesses, as well as supermarket collection points. Volunteers sort donations into emergency food parcels containing three days worth of nutritionally balanced, non-perishable food.

People may be referred to food banks by professionals such as doctors, social services, Citizens Advice and the police. They receive a voucher entitling them to receive a parcel from their local food bank. Food banks strive to provide compassionate, dignified support, and work to direct people to agencies that can assist with long-term issues in order to prevent people from needing to use food banks again.

The Trussell Trust runs two out of three UK food banks and gave out 823,145 food parcels from April to September 2019, of which 301,653 went to children. This was 23% more than during the same period in 2018. Insufficient benefit income caused 36%, delays in benefit payments caused 18% and changes to benefit caused 16%. Welfare changes like Universal Credit and the Bedroom tax caused increased food bank use. The Trussell Trust urged politicians from all parties to protect people from hunger. The Trust advocates ending the five-week wait for universal credit payments, ensuring benefit payments cover the basic costs of living, and emergency support for people in crisis. Emma Revie of the Trussell Trust said, "What's really concerning us is the steepness of the increase – 23% compared with the same period last year is such a step up. We're really worried about what the coming winter is going to look like." "Our benefits system is supposed to protect us all from being swept into poverty, but currently thousands of people and children are not receiving sufficient protection from destitution."

=== Research and campaigning ===
The Trussell Trust also carries out extensive research into food bank use in the UK, using this to campaign for change so that no one needs a food bank in the future. Working with the food banks in their network to gather evidence, the Trussell Trust regularly releases data on food bank use and is currently working on a three-year research project called State of Hunger. When complete, this will be the most extensive piece of research ever carried out on food bank use and hunger in the UK. The first year report was released in November 2019.

The Trussell Trust supports a number of charity coalitions including End Hunger UK, All Kids Count, Lift the Ban, and Stop the #DebtThreats. Their own campaign, #5WeeksTooLong, calls for an end to the current five-week wait for a first Universal Credit payment when people apply for the benefit. The campaign is backed by a range of organisations including The Children's Society, Child Poverty Action Group, Church Action on Poverty, Crisis, the Disability Benefits Consortium, Gingerbread, and Homeless Link.

In November 2023, The Trussell Trust calculated that a single adult in the UK in 2023 needs at least £29,500 a year to have an acceptable standard of living, up from £25,000 in 2022. Two partners with two children would need £50,000, compared to £44,500 in 2022. 29% of the UK population – which works out to 19.2 million people – belong to households that bring in below a minimum figure.

== See also ==
- 2021–present United Kingdom cost-of-living crisis
- FareShare
- Fuel poverty in the United Kingdom
- Hunger in the United Kingdom
- List of food banks
- Poverty in the United Kingdom
