= Third Sector (magazine) =

British publication on management

Third Sector is a British publication that covers the management of the voluntary and not-for-profit sector. It is run by the Haymarket Group, currently publishing a bi-monthly magazine, alongside a website and also organising events.

== History and profile ==
It launched in 2002, going head-to-head with another new title, Charity Week.

The magazine was given a new look in 2009, following an exercise to take account of reader feedback. In 2011, the magazine had a circulation of almost 11,500 per issue. By 2014 the print circulation had dropped to just over 6,200 per issue.

In 2015 the magazine launched an event called "Fundraising Week". The following year this was a three-day event held in London and incorporated an award ceremony.

== Third Sector Awards ==
Third Sector Awards is an annual awards scheme to recognize innovation and outstanding achievement by charities and their staff in communications and marketing, fundraising, finance, management, governance and working with other sectors. At first it was voted for by members; As of 2015 there is a panel of judges of submitted entries and it is managed by Haymarket Events and sponsored by Markel Corporation. As of 2018 there is an Australian edition. In 2020 the Third Sector Digital Awards were launched, which included a nomination for Clap for Our Carers in the category of 'Best Online Awareness Campaign'.
