= Gender and food security =

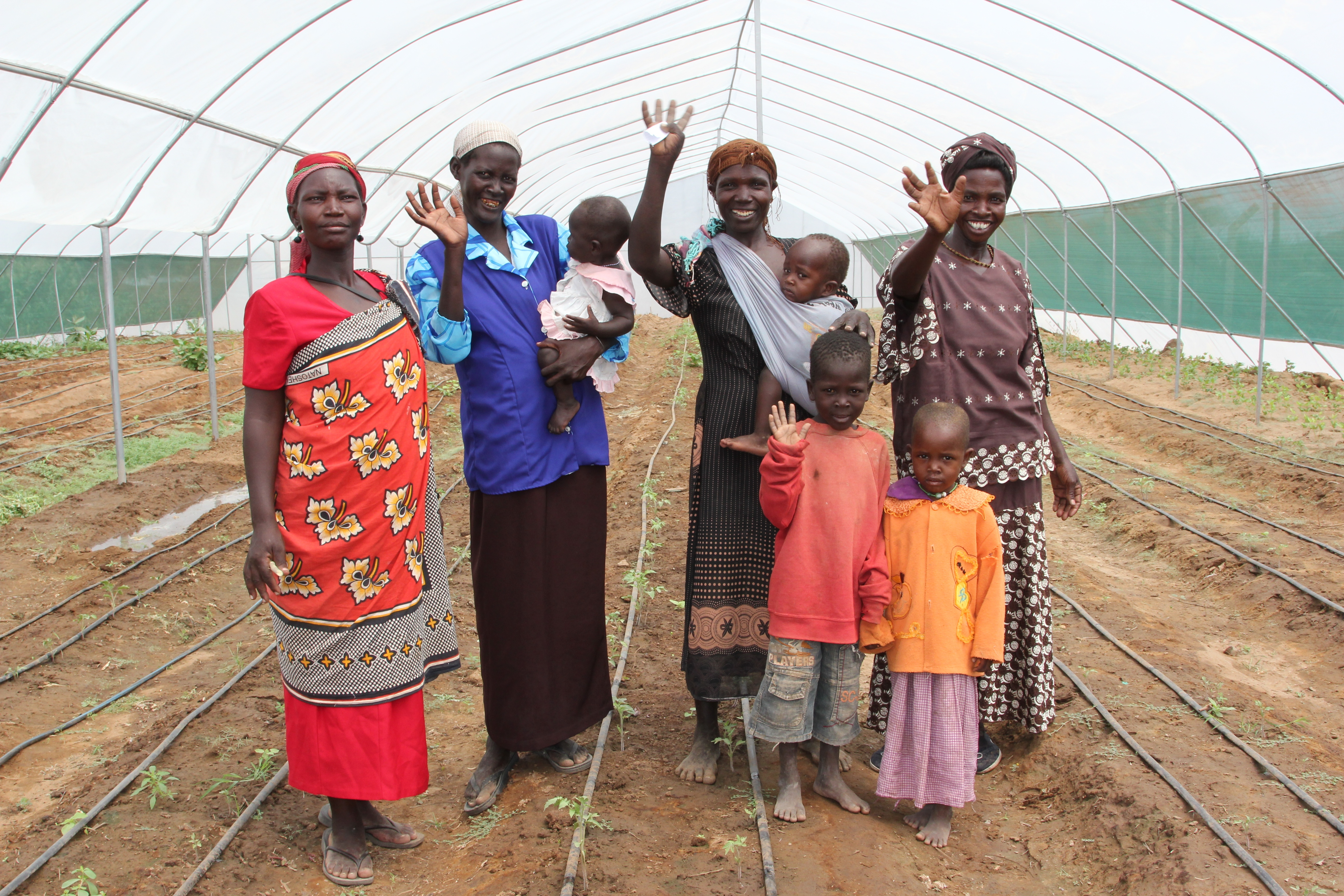
Female farmers in Kenya

Gender and Food security refers to how gender inequality shapes access to food, nutrition, and agricultural resources at global, national and household levels. Women play a central role in food production, particularly in developing countries, but often face structural barriers to land ownership, credit, technology, and decision-making power. These inequalities limit agricultural productivity and contribute to higher risks of food insecurity, especially among women and female-headed households.

Gender disparities affect all dimensions of food security, including food availability, access, utilization, and stability as defined by the Food and Agriculture Organization. Women access to land, markets, and financial resources remains more limited than men's while unequal division of unpaid labor and time constraints further restrict their participation in economic activities. Intra-household dynamics, including differences in bargaining power and resource allocation, also shape food distribution and nutritional outcomes.

Emerging challenges such as climate change, economic shocks, and conflict often disproportionately impact women due to existing inequalities in resource access and decision-making. Research from the Food and Agriculture Organization and the World Bank emphasizes that closing gender gaps in agriculture and strengthening women's land right, access to resources, and participation in policy processes can improve food security, enchance resilience, and reduce global hunger.

== Availability ==
According to the World Food Summit of 1996, food availability is defined as sufficient quantities of foods available on a consistent basis. Women play an important role in food production, processing, distribution and marketing. They often work as unpaid family workers, are involved in subsistence farming and represent about 43% of the agricultural labor force in developing countries, varying from 20% in Latin America to 50% in Eastern and Southeastern Asia and Sub-Saharan Africa. However, women face discrimination in access to land, credit, technologies, finance and other services. Empirical studies suggest that if women had the same access to productive resources as men, women could boost their yields by 20–30%; raising the overall agricultural output in developing countries by 2.5 to 4%. While those are rough estimates, the significant positive impact of closing the gender gap on agricultural productivity cannot be denied.

=== Access to land ===
Women's ability to own or inherit land is restricted in much of the developing world. Even in countries where women are legally permitted to own land, such as Uganda, research from Women's Land Link Africa shows that cultural norms and customs have excluded them from obtaining land ownership in practice. Globally, women own less than 20% of agricultural land. Typically, in most of the developing countries, a woman's use of land is restricted to temporary cultivation rights, allocated to her by her husband, and in exchange, she provides food and other goods for the household. She is not able to pass the land on to her heirs nor she will be entrusted with the land if her husband dies; the land is automatically granted to her husband's family or any male children the couple may have produced. Bina Agarwal, a development economist known for her work on women's property rights, states "the single most important factor affecting women’s situation is the gender gap in command over property." Agarwal claims that in many cases, rural women demand land rights, but she also confirms that some cases exist in which women do not identify land rights as a major problem. On the other hand, Cecile Jackson objects the claim of Agarwal on the ground that it is important to focus on gendering land questions instead of treating land issues only in terms of land rights of women as Agarwal does. Gendering land questions requires more ethnographic research of social relations around land.

Increasingly, as land privatization leads to the end of communal lands, women find themselves unable to use any land not bestowed upon them by their families, rendering unmarried women and widows vulnerable. Many women still face legal hurdles when attempting to acquire land through inheritance or the marketplace. In order to reorganize post-colonial societies, SADC states have engaged in land redistribution and resettlement programs, ranging from temporary lease-holding to permanent property rights. Even in cases where no gender bias is officially present in land redistribution policy, social custom permits officials to favor male-headed households and individual men over female-headed households and individual women.

Women in agricultural households remain significantly disadvantaged in landownership compared with men; half the countries reporting on Sustainable Development Goal Indicator 5.a.2 have weak legal protections for women’s land rights. The percentage of men who have ownership or secure tenure rights over agricultural land is twice that of women in more than 40 percent of the countries that have reported on women’s landownership (Sustainable Development Goal Indicator 5.a.1), and a larger percentage of men than women have such rights in 40 of 46 countries reporting. Even so, the share of women among landowners increased in 10 of 18 countries over the last decade, with marked improvements in several decade, with marked improvements in several countries in sub-Saharan Africa and southern Asia.

According to the Food and Agriculture Organization (FAO), closing the gender gaps in landownership and secure tenure is particularly important as secure land rights have multiple positive impacts. The FAO (2023) report further emphasizes that women's insecure land rights are part of broader structural inequalities across Agrifood Systems. The report highlights that strengthening women's tenure security improves not only agricultural production, but also household, food, security, resilience, and gender equality outcomes. Gaps can be narrowed through a combination of implementing reforms on land registration, increasing land-rights awareness and access to community-based legal aid, and fostering women’s participation in local land institutions. Additionally, services (such as extension) and resources (such as technology) must be designed with women’s needs in mind.

Enhancing women’s rights to own or have secure tenure over agricultural land has positive impacts on empowerment, investment, natural-resource management, access to services and institutions, resilience and food security, reducing gender-based violence and increasing women’s bargaining power.

=== Division of unpaid labor and time constraints ===
Particularly in rural areas, the use of women's time in agriculture is often constrained by obligations such as fetching water and wood, preparing meals for their families, cleaning, and tending to children and livestock. For example, in Ghana, Tanzania, and Zambia women expend most of their energy on load-carrying activities involving transport of fuel-wood, water, and grain for grinding.

The gendered division of labor in agriculture has been known to create unequal household power dynamics, responsibilities, and benefits from agriculture.

Women’s greater burden of unpaid domestic and care work, such as cleaning, cooking and caring for household members, contributes to inequalities in labour-market participation and outcomes. This is particularly evident in low- and middle-income countries. In rural areas, women’s unpaid-work burden is greater than that of men in large part because of the time they spend collecting water. The COVID-19 pandemic underscored the disproportionate burden women shoulder in unpaid care of children and other family members and the implications of this burden for women’s time and employment.

== Access to markets ==
Constraints to mobility and time, gendered divisions of labor as well as cultural and social norms hamper the access of women to markets. Women tend to be engaged in the production of traditional and subsistence crops offering less opportunities to benefit from market income; however, self-consumption might also be a conscious choice. Within the household women often have little decision-making power related to marketing and selling activities as well as over the spending of the money earned, although they often contribute considerably amounts of time to the production. For example, in parts of India women have to ask permission of their husbands to follow market activities. Engaging in markets offers opportunities like organic agriculture and collectives of landless women in Kenya used revenues from selling bananas and vegetables on local markets to compensate for shortfalls in their wages at coffee plantations. But reliance on markets also increases exposure to international market fluctuations, while women farmers are mainly smallholders and often unable to profit from export opportunities. In the Philippines, potato farmers felt the negative impacts of global market integration when imported potatoes cut market prices by half.

=== Access to technology, training, and infrastructure ===
A gendered role of women hinders access to technology, agricultural training, and rural infrastructure. Women's success in food security in most countries revolves around their reach to equal resources as men in aforementioned sectors. Women's limited access to technology resulted in the failure to address women's time constraints to agricultural activities. Moreover, agricultural training marginalizes women as they are normally conceived as farmwives rather than farmers. Rural infrastructure includes transport, energy, information and communication technologies. Women's access to infrastructure eases their burden of agricultural and domestic activities as well as encourages their participation in farming. However, privatization of infrastructure services hindered rural women and children from escaping poverty traps which constrain their ability to sustainably produce food for themselves and for market. The Center for Women's Global Leadership writes that "trade liberalization policies have increased their work burden and undermined their right to food."

=== Access to finance ===
Most financial services in rural areas are directed towards households, and the male members usually receive credit and insurance via development agencies. Another issue is that women are employed as mere helpers without any substantive decision-making power within rural farming families, rather than entrepreneurs who should have access to credit. Legislation and local customs hinder women's access to and control of assets that can be deemed as collateral such as land or livestock, by lending institutions. It is less likely for a woman to own land, even if their families own it, and they are also less likely to control land, even if they formally own it. Moreover, since there is bias in control over assets, livestock which is of a high-value is usually owned by men, whereas women mostly own low-value animals such as poultry. Such a system works against women as it offers lower security through their low-value livestock, and proves to be a serious hindrance for women to access credit due to lack of security. Another constraint is that lower literacy levels among women hinder their ability to communicate and understand the information that is communicated to them in writing, which in turn limits their understanding of complex financial products that are being offered to them.

== Access ==
The World Food Summit of 1996 defined access to food as to have "sufficient resources to obtain appropriate foods for a nutritious diet." It can be analyzed at national level – concerning the country's food access from the global market, at households level – concerning household member's ability to produce their own food or to purchase food from the market, and at individual level – concerning individual's ability to meet their nutritional needs. Most research of the nexus between gender and food access has been conducted at households level and under the perception of gender as women.

=== Women and household's food access ===
Women's access to food is closely connected to households' food access because they are typically responsible for food supply in households. Women can gain the access to food through producing it for their own consumption or purchasing it with income. Income is either generated from market activity or granted by redistributive mechanisms in the form of government's social protection measure or community's solidarity. Many studies conducted during the 1980s suggest that women typically spend a higher portion of their income on food and health care for children than men do. (Note: For relevant studies, G. Guyer, Household Budgets and Women's Incomes, African Studies Center Working Paper No.28 (Boston: Boston University, 1980); E. Fapohunda, “The Nonpooling Household: A Challenge to Theory,” in A Home Divided, ed. D. Dwyer and J. Bruce (Stanford, Calif., U.S.A.: Stanford University Press, 1988); R. Tripp, “Farmers and Traders: Some Economic Determinants of Nutritional Status in Northern Ghana,” Food and Nutrition 8, no. 1 (1982):3-12; D. Dwyer and J. Bruce, A Home Divided: Women and Income in the Third World (Stanford, Calif., U.S.A.: Stanford University Press, 1988); and J. Pahl, “The Allocation of Money within Marriage,” Sociological Review 32 (May 1983): 237 -264.) For example, a study in Côte d'Ivoire found that for men, it needs eleven times bigger income of women to improve children's nutrition to the same level at which women achieve. Another study demonstrated that poorer women-headed households often succeed in providing more nutritional food for their children than men-headed households. Studies explain such difference in income spending between men and women with several hypotheses. One of them is that societal and cultural norms may impose on women the role of ensuring adequate share of food among household members. When a study interviewed people living near Lake Victoria, women typically considered their children as the first or second greatest expenditure, while men did not view them as a cost. Another hypothesis is that women may prefer to spend more on children's daily needs as they share more time with them. The other hypothesis is that different income flow of women from men causes different transaction costs. According to a study, men typically contribute to large and one-off payments while women spend for daily household expenditure.

=== Constraints to food access ===
Food access by women can be constrained physically, or more frequently economically due to a gendered role of women. Moreover, the gendered role of women can create sociocultural constraints to food access. These constraints are interrelated with each other. For example, sociocultural norms toward women can limit women's mobility, imposing physical constraints, whereas physical constraints can hinder women to be engaged into the market, deteriorating their economic access to food.

==== Physical access to food ====
Women are less mobile and more time-constrained due to both gender-based division of labor in household and sociocultural norms. While men are generally responsible only for income-generating activities, women are in charge of not only childcare but also time-consuming domestic activities. In sub-Saharan Africa, women spend large amount of time transporting supplies of domestic use – such as fuelwood and water – and traveling between home and field for domestic task.

==== Economic access to food ====
Women have less decision-making power in household. Moreover, they have less chances for income-generating activities in the market. An analysis of poverty measures in rural Ghana and Bangladesh showed that more persons in female-headed households are below poverty line. The inferior position of women in and outside household is interconnected because if women do not have economically constructed better alternative to staying with their husbands, they will be unlikely to make a voice against their husbands.

- Limited Control over Resources in Household - Women have weak economic autonomy in household as they are attributed smaller amount of household income compared to men. In a study of fishery villages of lake Victoria, men did not reveal their income to women, while they expected women to do so. Many women were compelled to hide their income, if they earn, in order to avoid that husbands withdraw all financial assistance to the household. Apart from material resources, women's own time can be under control of other household members. Purdah, a custom of women seclusion in some countries, is an extreme case of women's inability to control the way of spending their time.
- Limited Education Opportunities - Women have limited access to educational opportunities. Women tend to have lower educational status than men, and therefore more difficulties in finding formal wage employment. A study found that in Kampala, most women involved in urban farming have only primary education, or none at all. It determines kinds of their work – few of them participate in the formal sector and many are housewives, or farm in their backyards, or trade foodstuff by the roadsides.
- Limited Employment Opportunities - Women have limited access to employment opportunities. When women are self-employed in subsistence farming and meeting household needs, it is not counted as an economic activity in the market. Moreover, when women are employed on or off farm, they are likely to be located in periphery segment of operation and work in inadequate conditions because they have few options in the employment market. As a consequence, women may have not enough income to purchase food.
- Less Investment in Girls - Limitations which women face in the market leads to underinvestment by parents in girls, making a vicious cycle. Until they benefit from improved employment opportunities of girls, parents would have little incentive to educate girls because of their dim prospect.

==== Socio-cultural access to food ====
Customs and culture often dictate differential roles, privileges, and life options for women and men, especially in favor of the latter. A study found that in Ethiopia where girls have faced historical discrimination girls were more likely to be food insecure than boys. This is because when food stress happens to a household, adult members buffer younger members in a preferential way for boys over girls.

== Utilization ==
Household decision-making models assume family as a homogeneous unit operating with a common utility function, whose members share the same amount of access to and utilization of household's resources including food. However, these models are not capable to explain dynamics impacting intra-household resource allocation and its effects to distribution within the family.

There is a huge number of empirical and theoretical studies declining altruistic family joint utility function theory of Becker. Sen's theory of intra-household bargaining shows the inequality in decision-making process among different members of households and how this inequality affects distribution of resources.

=== Case studies ===
Recent empirical case studies show that food allocation is sometimes preferentially distributed to certain members of households according to age, gender, health, or labor productivity and not all members benefit equally from it.

==== Differences of food utilization of women in polygamous households in Burkina Faso ====
The magnitude of inequality is more prevalent in Sub-Saharan Africa where males are the primary decision makers within extended families and polygamy is quite common. Mostly, women work in small lands to provide food for themselves and their children. According to a research in Burkina Faso, women in polygamous households were considerably more food insecure in comparison with their equals in monogamous households in case of food scarcity.

The same research also shows how ranking among women within polygamous households matter in terms of food security and suggest that last-order women in polygamous households is more food secure in good times due to her relatively close tie with the household head. Yet, this advantage turns into a disadvantage due to her less access to arable land and her relative incompetence to establish a supportive network, unlike elder women in the same polygamous households, which can prevent her from food shortage when the households face with food insecurity.

==== Buffering bias against girls in Ethiopia ====
Many studies focus on resource allocation within households suggest that younger households are buffered from food insecurity by adults. However, these studies do not address whether the buffering experiences of young households are gendered.

Hadley et al. observed "buffering hypothesis" in the city of Jimma, Ethiopia, where adult members of households waive some part of their food to buffer younger households in case of food insecurity. The research showed that girls are discriminated against boys since buffering aims at boys, 41% of girls in severely food insecure households also experienced food insecurity compared to 20% of boys in severely food insecure households.

==== No difference in food security among female and male-headed households in indigenous ethnic groups in Bangladesh ====
A research on four indigenous ethnic groups in Bengal found that there was no significant difference in food security between the male and female headed households in these communities. This finding was in contrast to general wisdom that the "female headed households are more vulnerable to food insecurity".

Lack of cultural and social restrictions on women such as participation in the labor force enables these women to perceive themselves food secure unlike societies where patriarchal norms are strong and there exist a number of restrictions on women.

On the other hand, another study in rural Bangladesh shows that malnutrition is prevalent in girls than boys. The research used Harvard weight-for-age standard, which found that 14.4% of girls were classified as severely malnourished in comparison with only 5.1% of boys, showing sex-biased nutrition-related practices favoring boys.

==== Gender and Food Security in the United States ====
In the United States, food insecurity impacts a wide-range of households across country but is highest among households led by women and women who live alone. Additionally, Black and Latinx single mothers are disproportionately impacted.

Low food security does not only display itself in hunger and decrease in body size, but also in weight-gaining. According to a number of studies showing the linkage between low food security and sex differences, low food security is linked to being over-weight and "gaining 5 pounds or more in one year, but only among women". "Very low food security is associated with being underweight, but again only for women".

An empirical research is conducted between mothers and non-mothers in the US to understand the relation between "motherness" in gaining weight for women. The research found statistically significant association between "motherness" and "food insecurity". Relatively income-restrained single mothers, in parallel to the requirements of traditional expectations and socially constructed roles for them, risk their individual health by skipping meals, eat less or consume high-calorie but nutritionally-poor food, in order to provide food security of their children.

Food insecurity in minority communities in the United States is largely due to low wages, food deserts, and racism.

== Stability ==
Stability refers to adequate access to food for populations, households, or individuals that is stable over time. Both shocks and cyclical events can influence stability negatively. Limited access to resources, increasing care and time burdens and less decision-making power for women resulting from gendered roles in society lead to differential experiences of and coping mechanisms for instability.

=== Climate change ===
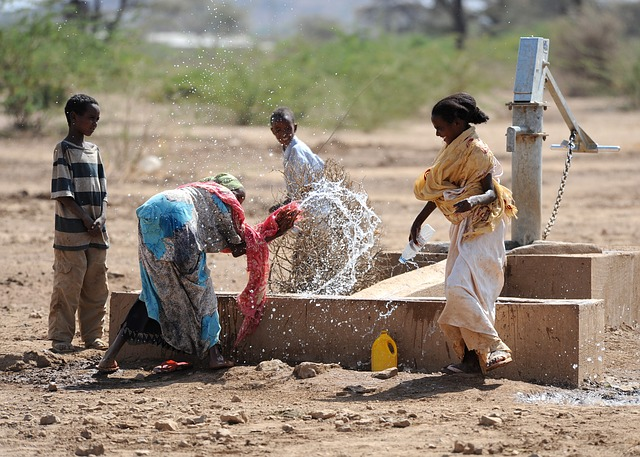
Women and boys at a well in Ethiopia

Research findings suggest that gender roles in society and gendered access to resources will result in differential affects, coping and adaptation strategies for women and men in response to climate change. Representing increasing shares of smallholders and working on marginal lands declining agricultural yields will be felt disproportionally by women as producers. Additionally, women's access to resources and information is often more limited. For example, in South Africa male fishers were warned about El Niño, while women were not. In drought-prone regions in India women have less access to agricultural information and services to adapt to climate change, and coping strategies vary by gender: women tend to seek local wage labor, while men migrate. For women geographic mobility is often limited, and they are left with the additional burden of the work priorly done by the men after those migrate. As consumers women are likely to feel increased prices stronger because of lower purchasing power and unequal bargaining power within households. Another reason for differential impacts is the distribution of labor within households: with climate change water and fuelwood scarcity as well as negative health effects on children and other dependents can put additional time constraints on females. Women often lack a voice in decision making at local and international levels, but climate change could also be an opportunity for renegotiation of gender roles and female empowerment.

While women are not inherently more at risk from climate change and shocks, resource and other constraints can make them more sensitive to their effects and less able to adapt to them, increasing their vulnerability. For example, women’s work burdens, including hours worked in agriculture, tend to decline less than men’s during climate shocks such as heat stress. Discriminatory gender norms limiting women’s mobility and their ability to access extension services and climate information present further obstacles to climate adaptation. Women are also often underrepresented in climate policy decision-making at all levels.

=== Food-price shocks ===
Poor households are more at risk from food price spikes and increased food price volatility, because food expenditures account for a large proportion of their income, up to 67% for the extreme poor in Bangladesh. High dependency ratios and discrimination, among others regarding employment, access to land, and social transfers make female-headed households especially vulnerable to rising food prices. In Bangladesh 38% of female-headed compared to 23% of male-headed households were found to be food-insecure in 2009 and in Ethiopia female-headed households were more vulnerable to the 2007–08 world food price crisis. In Bangladesh female workers in the textile industry were hit hard by the food price crisis of 2008, because their wages did not adjust to rising food prices. IFPRI found that only few countries introduce safety nets in response to food crisis, and these are seldom targeted towards women. Within households women often act as shock-absorbers increasing their work load and decreasing their consumption. Pregnant women are particularly vulnerable, with negative repercussions on their and their children's future prospects, and girls are often the first ones to be taken out of school. In 2024 food insecurity still more prevalent among adult women than men in every region of the world. The gender gap widened considerably at the global level in the wake of the pandemic, most notably in 2021; it then grew smaller for two consecutive years followed by a widening of the gap at the global level between 2023 and 2024.

=== Financial and economic crisis ===
The impacts of past crises, including the 1997 Asian financial crisis, the 1994 economic crisis in Mexico and structural adjustment in Africa, have differed by gender. This pattern has also been confirmed in the most recent 2008 financial crisis. For example, in the US subprime mortgages were targeted towards female-headed households and females are often the first ones to be dismissed. In a global survey 40% of respondents agreed that men have more right to employment in case of scarce employment opportunities. In Asia women were overrepresented in export, low-skilled, low-wage and informal sectors and consequently felt the crisis more severely. In addition, working hours are likely to increase and wages to decrease for those remaining in employment. Disaggregated data by gender is rare, but research suggests that as a result of the Asian crisis of 1997-99 childhood anemia rose by 50%-65%, and maternal anemia by 15%-19% in Indonesia, while maternal anemia increased by 22% in Thailand.

=== Conflict and natural disasters ===
Gender and age are the two most important determinants of the impacts of conflict and natural disasters on individuals. Women are more likely to be displaced, the task of females in catching firewood has contributed to rape and equal access to food aid after crisis can be undermined by corruption, local militias or distances. In addition men are more likely to die in conflict or migrate, leaving women in charge of the household and increasing the burden on women. Country experiences from Somalia show that women's contribution to household income has increased during the conflict as well as their influence on decision-making. Other problems, are that in conflict situations women are not always able to claim the land priorly owned by their husbands, and in Cambodia women received marginal lands in redistribution following conflict, partly because they were more likely to be illiterate. Similarly, natural disasters, triggered by climate change or other factors, have been found to put additional care burdens on women post-disaster, while limited mobility and work opportunities outside of the home reduce their range of coping strategies. Especially in unequal societies limited access to resources compounds women's vulnerability to natural disasters.

Conflict and insecurity remain key drivers of food crises and food insecurity. Women are often more vulnerable than men to acute food insecurity because they face additional risks, barriers and disadvantages. Violent conflicts also have gender-differentiated impacts on mobility, gender-based violence, health and education outcomes, and political and civic engagement. Conflict increases employment in agriculture more for women than for men. However, while it reduces the working hours of both men and women, women’s working hours are reduced less than those of men.

== Gender and global food security policy ==
Many small-scale, women-centered, agricultural cooperatives have emerged in developing countries to fulfill these needs by pooling resources, establishing economies of scale, and creating greater collective bargaining power for resources, land rights, and market access. One such urban agriculture project is Abalimi Bezekhaya, in Cape Town, South Africa, which provides training, manure, set-up and maintenance of an irrigation system, and R150 (US$15) to each participant. Most of the participants are women. According to Liziwe Stofile, who trains new farmers, "The reason that women take over most of the community gardens is because they want to take vegetables home to feed their children. The men only want to make money."

Macroeconomic factors should also be taken into account, such as the emergence of neo-liberal capitalist policies imposed through the Washington Consensus which include Structural Adjustment Programs, austerity measures, and an emphasis on expanding export-oriented trade at the expense of small-scale producers and rural development. The Center for Women's Global Leadership reported in 2011 that the expectation that this economic shift would increase the global food supply resulted in the strengthening of powerful transnational companies through heavy subsidization, while overall food security faltered as "developing countries withdrew investment in agriculture and rural development, leading to a decline in their long-term productive capacity and transforming them into net food importers."

=== Policy issues ===
Previously ignored, the accommodation of gender in agriculture is crucial for development policies in developing countries. Researchers, aid donors and policymakers are witnessing how important the role of gender is in agricultural programs, and how it can be utilized to improve productivity. Hence, there is a strong need to tackle issues that affect women, and to employ the expertise of women's groups as competent collaborators in improving agricultural productivity. According to the World Bank's Gender in Agricultural Sourcebook, women make up more than 50 percent of the labour force, and are in involved in three-quarters of food production in sub-Saharan Africa, but most development policies are gender-blind, and failure to include the role of women as producers further exacerbates the situation.

The Food and Agricultural Organization's (FAO) report titled State of Food and Agriculture 2010–2011, and the World Bank's World Development Report 2012 illustrate women's input in the area of agriculture in developing countries. FAO's report focuses on the urgency with which the gender gap needs to be closed when it comes to agricultural resources, education, extension, financial services, and labour markets that women are denied access to. Moreover, it highlights the need for increased investment in labour-saving and productivity enhancing mechanisms, along with better infrastructure to enable women to engage in more productive activities that encourage women's involvement in fair, flexible, and efficient rural labour markets.

The World Development Report 2012 strongly emphasizes that closing the gender gap will lead to improvements in productivity, and identifies areas where policies can address the issues related to gender gap such girl's education, excessive female deaths, decreasing poverty gaps between men and women, improving women's access to economic opportunities, pushing women's agendas into the public sphere, and discouraging the spread of gender inequality onto the future generations.

Key developmental organizations and aid donors are now including the gender dimension to their programmes, and to their programme monitoring structures. For example, FAO's gender strategy, found in the FAO Policy for Gender Equality 2013, includes assigning 30 percent of FAO's operational work and budget at the country and regional levels to targeted, women-specific interventions by 2017, and to disaggregate all data in every FAO statistical databases by sex. Another example is the Women's Empowerment in Agriculture Index, developed by the US government's Feed the Future programme which aims to decrease poverty and food insecurity. The index assesses different indicators of women's empowerment, and compares scores produced by these indicators over a period of time to evaluate if empowerment is produced as a result of Feed the Future, which runs in 19 focus countries.

=== Policy proposals ===
To decrease the gender gap in agriculture, policies and programs should not only be focused on improving productivity and livelihood of women, but should also play a role in empowering women in their households and communities. Women are often denied access to tangible assets such as land, irrigation, tools, technology, as well as non-tangible assets such financial, human and social capital.

==== Land ====
The legislation surrounding land inheritance would benefit from reforms that are aimed at supporting women's property rights. For example, the Hindu Succession (Amendment) Act 2005 is amended to remove provisions that are deemed to be discriminatory towards women. However, such reforms must be addressed with caution since customary land rights and succession practices are strongly implemented in rural societies, where the practice may not be gender neutral. Hence, policymakers should incorporate this factor and ensure that efficient mechanisms are in place to ensure that the law is implemented equally across all areas.

==== Tools and technology ====
Access to technology and tools is essential in improving the role of women producers, because in some cases women do not possess the financial means to purchase tools while in other cases, they may not be socially permitted to own or use tools. Gender transformative policies regarding this issue should incorporate women's needs when designing policies.

==== Microfinance ====
Rural women often rely on microfinance for credit, but this mechanism can be modified to meet other needs such a way of making and receiving payments, such as through mobile phones, or allow women to be involved in markets for purchasing inputs, and selling their produce. Such a system is crucial for women who live in societies where their mobility is restricted.

==== Agricultural expertise ====
Gender blind policies should also address an important barrier, which is access to agricultural advisory services for women. Transformative policies would include female experts or a group based delivery mechanism that incorporates the social stigma of private interaction with the opposite sex. Such a policy would reinforce the notion of women as farmers, as well as meet their needs for information.

The Women's Empowerment in Agriculture Index (WEAI) is the first measure to directly capture women's empowerment and inclusion levels in the agricultural sector. The index considers five factors to be indicative of women's overall empowerment in the agricultural sector:

- Decisions over agricultural production
- Power over productive resources such as land and livestock
- Decisions over income
- Leadership in the community
- Time use

Women are considered empowered if they score adequately in at least four of the components. The index functions at the country or regional level, working with individually based data of men and women in the same households. Gender-sensitive indexes such as WEAI are intended to aid governments, scholars, and organizations to make informed and educated decisions regarding food and gender policy in regionally specific agendas. Gender consciousness in policy-making may lead to decisions to support women's individual or cooperative agricultural endeavors, reform land laws, reduce market restrictions, allow for greater access to the international market, or provide targeted training and inputs.

== Sources ==
This article incorporates text from a free content work. Licensed under CC BY-SA 3.0 (license statement/permission). Text taken from The status of women in agrifood systems – Overview, FAO, FAO.

This article incorporates text from a free content work. Licensed under CC BY 4.0 (license statement/permission). Text taken from The State of Food Security and Nutrition in the World 2025, Food and Agriculture Organization of the United Nations.
