= Great Recession in South America =

Overview of the impact of the Great Recession in South Africa

The Great Recession in South America primarily involved disruptions to the bond markets of Brazil, Argentina, Colombia and Venezuela. As most South American countries are commodity exporters, they were not directly affected by the financial turmoil.

The continent experienced a concurrent agricultural crisis in early 2008. Food prices increased due to use of arable land for the production of biofuels. Second generation biofuel processes increased production sustainability, using biomass from inedible parts of food crops, such as stems, leaves and husks. Other non-food crops, such as switchgrass, grass, jatropha, whole crop maize, and miscanthus could be used to produce biofuels without impacting food production. Industry waste products (such as, woodchips, skins and pulp) also replace the need to waste arable land for biofuels. Food prices, rose significantly from 2002, reaching a peak during the first quarter of 2008, with the average food price rising 50% over one year.

Subsequently, South American countries were affected by the global slowdown and decreased food prices from declining demand. In June 2008, the Economic Commission for Latin America and the Caribbean (ECLAC) expected 4% growth for 2009. However, by year end it predicted 2009 would end the six years of prosperity where Latin America benefited from high raw material prices. The region's production was expected to decline and unemployment to increase. The Center for Economic and Policy Research emphasised careful macro-economic policies to mitigate damage, with South American countries increasingly independent of the U.S. economy.

== Countries ==
=== Argentina ===
As the second-largest economy in South America and an important exporter of both machinery and agricultural goods, Argentina was affected by the global slowdown. The country saw slower economic growth, a steep drop in commodities prices, and a damaging drought in the farm provinces. Local economists expected recession. Former President Néstor Kirchner, husband of then president, Cristina Fernández de Kirchner, leader of the ruling Justicialist Party, gave a speech on February 17, 2009, predicting the international crisis would cause Argentina's "most difficult year in the last century."

=== Brazil ===
Though escaping the early impacts of the Great Recession, Brazil's economy shrank 3.5% in the fourth quarter of 2008, industrial production 17.2% lower in January 2009 than the prior year. GDP grew by 5.1% over 2008. Capital spending fell 9.8% and household consumption by 2% in the fourth quarter. The Wall Street Journal showed a 13.6% drop in gross domestic product in the 4th quarter of 2008 on an annualized rate and industrial production for December 2008 18.6% lower than December 2007, with 700,000 fewer jobs between November 2008 and February 2009.

=== Caribbean Islands ===
The International Monetary Fund (IMF) reported as soon as February 2008 that a U.S. slowdown would hurt the economies of the Caribbean Islands, especially the Eastern Islands. The tourism sector is a large part of the Islands' economies, and are heavily dependent on U.S. visitors. However, lower inflation and currency depreciation in several Latin American and Caribbean nations may have offset this impact of the Great Recession, stimulating tourism.

=== Ecuador ===
Ecuador sought to default on sovereign debts incurred under the government of Gustavo Noboa, claiming the debts were incurred illegally. An Ecuador default, would have been the first developing country to default on sovereign debt since the crisis began.

== See also ==
- Great Recession in the Americas
- Great Recession in the United States
- Timeline of the Great Recession
