= 2007–2008 world food price crisis =

World food prices increased dramatically in 2007 and the 1st and 2nd quarter of 2008

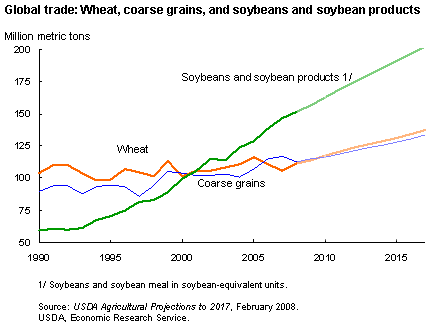
Chart of global trade volume in wheat, coarse grain and soybeans 1990 to 2008, and projected to 2016. United States Department of Agriculture, 2008.

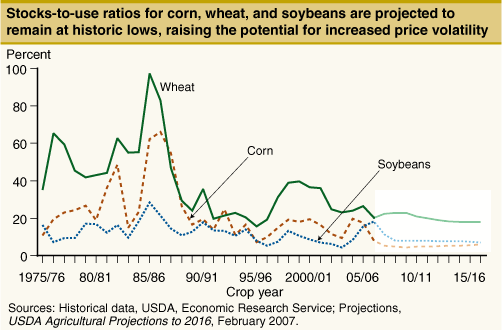
Chart of the United States stock to use ratio of soybeans, maize and wheat, from 1977 to 2007, and projected to 2016. United States Department of Agriculture, September 2007.

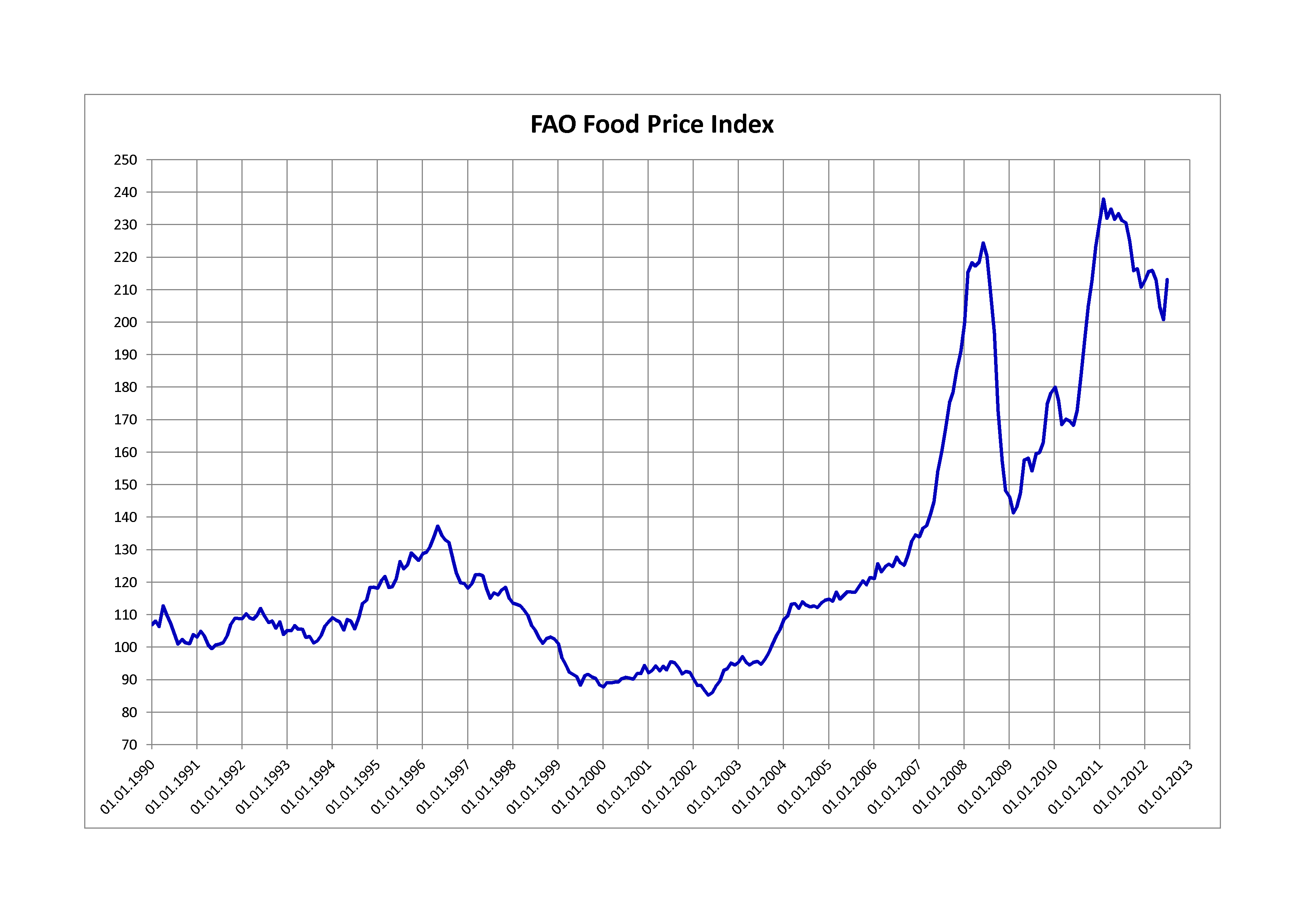
World food price index, 1990–2012. Record high prices occurred during the food price crisis followed by another surge in prices since 2010. Food and Agriculture Organization of the United Nations.

World food prices increased dramatically in 2007 and the first and second quarter of 2008, creating a global crisis and causing political and economic instability and social unrest in both poor and developed nations. Although the media spotlight focused on the riots that ensued in the face of high prices, the ongoing crisis of food insecurity had been years in the making. Systemic causes for the worldwide increases in food prices continue to be the subject of debate. After peaking in the second quarter of 2008, prices fell dramatically during the late-2000s recession but increased during late 2009 and 2010, reaching new heights in 2011 and 2012 (see 2010–2012 world food price crisis) at a level slightly higher than the level reached in 2008. Over the next years, prices fell, reaching a low in March 2016 with the deflated Food and Agriculture Organization (FAO) food price index close to the pre-crisis level of 2006.

The initial causes of the late-2006 price spikes included droughts in grain-producing nations and rising oil prices. Oil price increases also caused general escalations in the costs of fertilizers, food transportation, and industrial agriculture. Root causes may be the increasing use of biofuels in developed countries (see also food vs fuel), and an increasing demand for a more varied diet across the expanding middle-class populations of Asia. The FAO also raised concerns about the role of hedge funds speculating on prices leading to major shifts in prices. These factors, coupled with falling world-food stockpiles, all contributed to the worldwide rise in food prices.

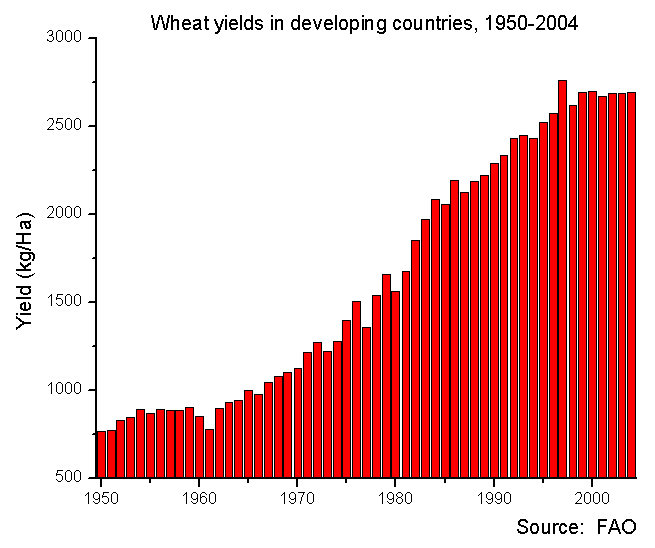
Wheat yields in developing countries, 1950 to 2004, kg/HA baseline 500. The steep rise in crop yields in the US began in the 1940s. The percentage of growth was fastest in the early rapid growth stage. In developed counties the yield growth slowdown has been less for maize than for wheat and soybeans. In developing countries maize yields are still rapidly rising.

== Drastic price increases and possible causes ==
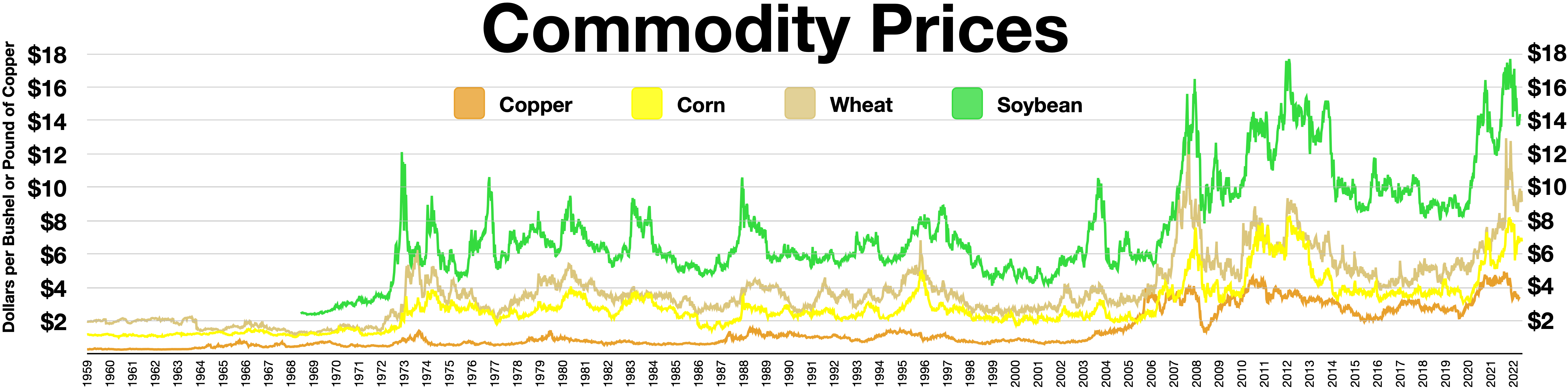
Commodity Prices soybean wheat corn copper

Between 2006 and 2008 average world prices for rice rose by 217%, wheat by 136%, corn by 125% and soybeans by 107%. In late April 2008 rice prices hit 24 cents (US) per US pound, more than doubling the price in just seven months.

=== World population growth ===
Growth in food production was greater than population growth since 1961.

Although some commentators have argued that this food crisis stems from unprecedented global population growth, others point out that world population growth rates have dropped dramatically since the 1980s, and grain availability has continued to outpace population.

To prevent price growth, food production should outpace population growth, which was about 1.2% per year. But there was a temporary drop in food production growth: for example, wheat production during 2006 and 2007 was 4% lower than that in 2004 and 2005.

World population has grown from 1.6 billion in 1900 to over 7.5 billion today.

=== Increased demand for more resource intensive food ===
The head of the International Food Policy Research Institute, stated in 2008 that the gradual change in diet among newly prosperous populations is the most important factor underpinning the rise in global food prices. Where food consumption has increased, it has largely been in processed ("value added") foods, sold in developing and developed nations. Total grain utilization growth since 2006 (up three percent, over the 2000–2006 per annum average of two percent) has been greatest in non-food usage, especially in feed and biofuels.

One kilogram of beef requires seven kilograms of feed grain. These reports, therefore, conclude that usage in industrial, feed, and input intensive foods, not population growth among poor consumers of simple grains, has contributed to the price increases. Rising meat consumption due to changes in lifestyle can in turn lead to higher energy consumption due to the higher energy-intensity of meat products, for example, one kilogram of meat uses about 19 times as much energy to produce it as the same amount of apple.

2005/1990 ratios of per-capita consumption
| | India | China | Brazil | Nigeria |
|---|---|---|---|---|
| Cereals | 1.0 | 0.8 | 1.2 | 1.0 |
| Meat | 1.2 | 2.4 | 1.7 | 1.0 |
| Milk | 1.2 | 3.0 | 1.2 | 1.3 |
| Fish | 1.2 | 2.3 | 0.9 | 0.8 |
| Fruits | 1.3 | 3.5 | 0.8 | 1.1 |
| Vegetables | 1.3 | 2.9 | 1.3 | 1.3 |

Although, the vast majority of the population in Asia remains rural and poor, the growth of the middle class in the region has been dramatic. For comparison, in 1990, the middle class grew by 9.7 percent in India and 8.6 percent in China, but by 2007 the growth rate was nearly 30 percent and 70 percent respectively. The corresponding increase in Asian affluence also brought with it a change in lifestyle and eating habits, particularly a demand for greater variety, leading to increased competition with western nations for already strained agricultural resources. This demand exacerbates dramatic increases in commodity prices such as oil.

Another issue with rising affluence in India and China was reducing the "shock absorber" of poor people who are forced to reduce their resource consumption when food prices rise. This reduced price elasticity and caused a sharp rise in food prices during some shortages. In the media, China is often mentioned as one of the main reasons for the increase in world food prices. However, China has to a large extent been able to meet its own demand for food, and even exports its surpluses in the world market.

=== Effects of petroleum and fertilizer price increases ===
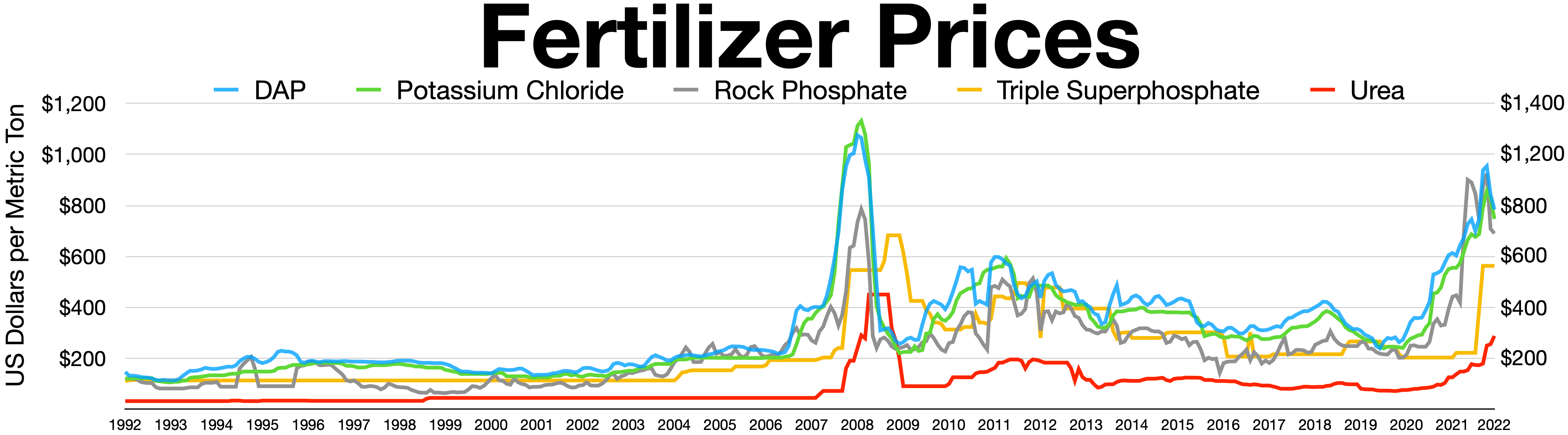
Fertilizer prices DAP Potassium chloride Phosphorite Triple Superphosphate Urea

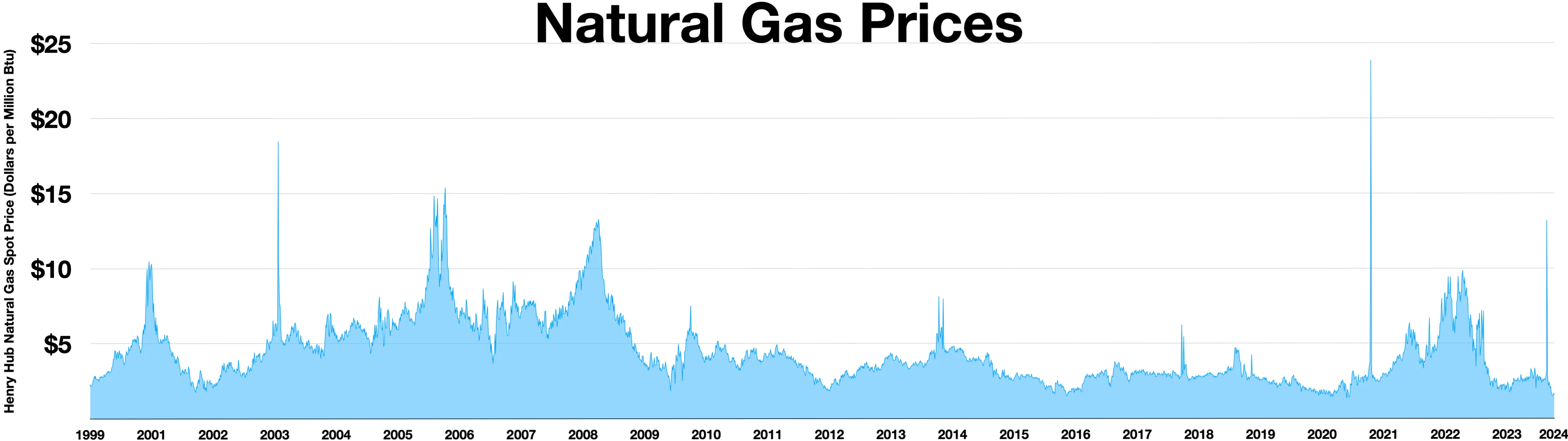
Natural gas prices 2000 – May 23, 2022

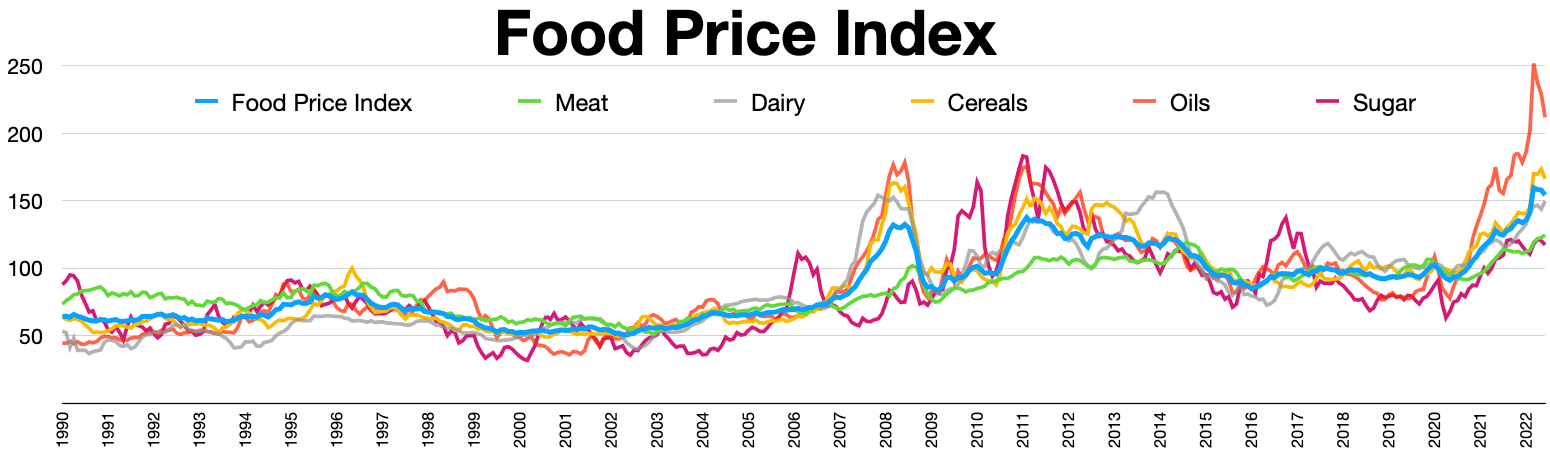
Food Price Index Oils Cereals Dairy Meat sugar

Starting in 2007, the prices of fertilizers of all kinds increased dramatically, peaking around the summer of 2008 (see graphs by the International Fertilizer Industry Association). Prices approximately tripled for ammonia, urea, diammonium phosphate, muriate of potash (KCl -potassium chloride), and sulfuric acid (used for making phosphate fertilizer), and then fell just as dramatically in the latter part of 2008. Some prices doubled within the six months before April 2008. Part of the cause for these price rises was the rise in the price of oil, since most fertilizers require petroleum or natural gas to manufacture. Although the main fossil fuel input for fertilizer comes from natural gas to generate hydrogen for the Haber–Bosch process (see: Ammonia production), natural gas has its own supply problems similar to those for oil. Because natural gas can substitute for petroleum in some uses (for example, natural gas liquids and electricity generation), increasing prices for petroleum lead to increasing prices for natural gas, and thus for fertilizer.

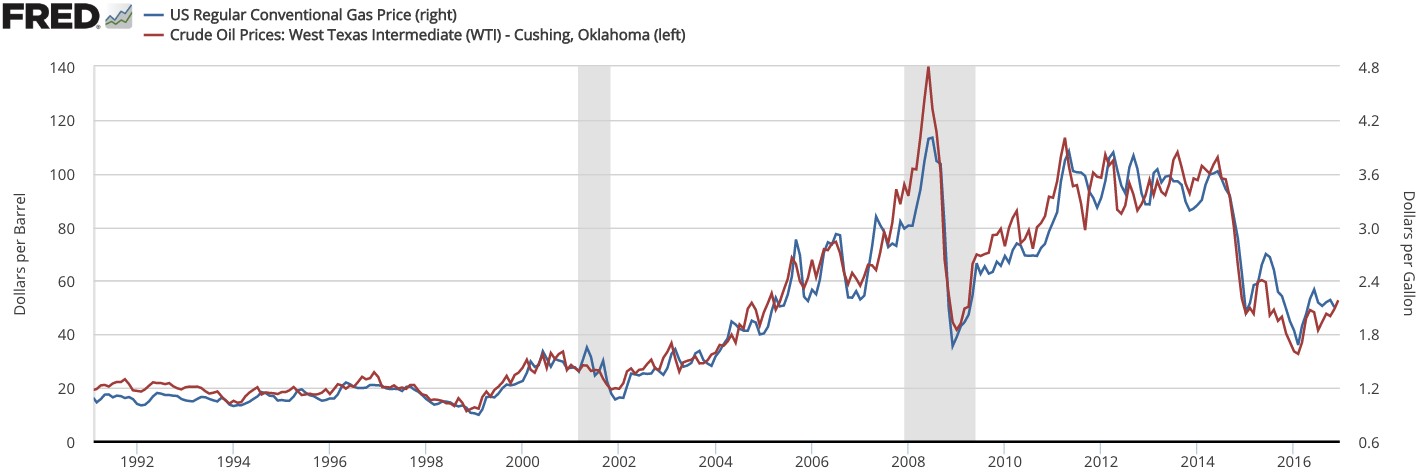
Crude oil prices and gas prices

Costs for fertilizer raw materials other than oil, such as potash, have been increasing as increased production of staples increases demand. This is causing a boom (with associated volatility) in agriculture stocks.

The major IFPRI ( International Food Policy Research Institute) Report launched in February 2011 stated that the causes of the 2008 global food crisis were similar to that of the 1972–1974 food crisis, in that the 1970s energy crisis was the major driver, as well as the shock to cereal demand (from biofuels this time), low interest rates, devaluation of the dollar, declining stocks, and some adverse weather conditions. Unfortunately the IFPRI states that such shocks are likely to recur with several shocks in the future; compounded by a long history of neglecting agricultural investments.

=== Declining world food stockpiles ===
In the past, nations tended to keep more sizable food stockpiles, but more recently, due to a faster pace of food growth and ease of importation, less emphasis is placed on high stockpiles. For example, in February 2008 wheat stockpiles hit a 60-year low in the United States (see also 2008 global rice crisis). Stocks are often calculated as a residual between production and consumption, but it becomes difficult to discriminate between a de-stocking policy choices of individual countries and a deficit between production and consumption.

=== Financial speculation ===
Destabilizing influences, including indiscriminate lending and real estate speculation, led to a crisis in January 2008 and eroded investment in food commodities.

Foreign investment drives productivity improvements, and other gains for farmers.

==== Commodity index funds ====
Goldman Sachs' entry into the commodities market via the Goldman Sachs Commodity Index has been implicated by some in the 2007–2008 world food price crisis. In a 2010 article in Harper's magazine, Frederick Kaufman accused Goldman Sachs of profiting while many people went hungry or even starved. He argued that Goldman's large purchases of long-options on wheat futures created a demand shock in the wheat market, which disturbed the normal relationship between supply and demand and price levels. He argues that the result was a 'contango' wheat market on the Chicago Mercantile Exchange, which caused prices of wheat to rise much higher than normal, defeating the purpose of the exchanges (price stabilization) in the first place. however, a report by the Organisation for Economic Co-operation and Development – using data from the Commodity Futures Trading Commission – showed tracking funds (of which Goldman Sachs Commodity Index was one) did not cause the bubble. For example, the report points out that even commodities without futures markets also saw price rises during the period. Some commodities without futures markets saw their prices rise as a consequence of the rising prices of commodities with futures markets: the World Development Movement (WDM, now Global Justice Now) stated there was strong evidence that the rising price of wheat caused the price of rice to subsequently rise as well.

=== Effects of trade liberalization ===
Some theorists, such as Martin Khor of the Third World Network, point out that many developing nations have gone from being food independent to being net food importing economies since the 1970s and 1980s International Monetary Fund (and later the World Trade Organization's Agreement on Agriculture) free market economics directives to debtor nations. In opening developing countries to developed world food imports subsidised by Western governments, developing nations can become more dependent upon food imports if local agriculture does not improve.

While developed countries pressured the developing world to abolish subsidies in the interest of trade liberalization, rich countries largely kept subsidies in place for their own farmers. United States government subsidies for 2008 pushed production toward biofuel rather than food.

=== Effects of food for fuel ===
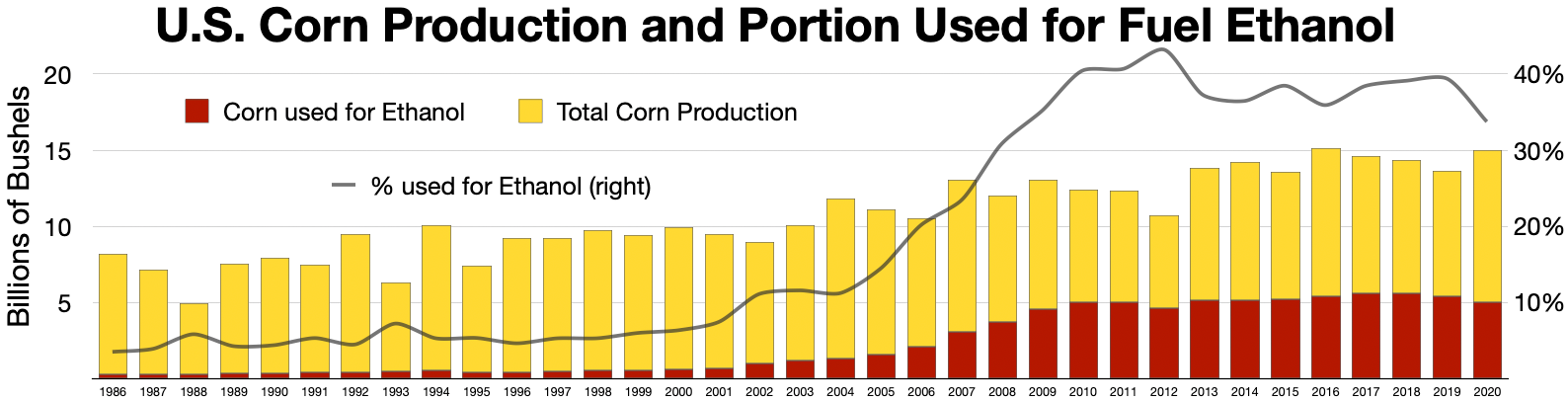
Corn vs Ethanol production in the United States Total corn production (bushels) (left) Corn used for Ethanol fuel (bushels) (left) Percent of corn used for Ethanol (right)

One systemic cause for the price rise is held to be the diversion of food crops (maize in particular) for making first-generation biofuels. An estimated 100 million tons of grain per year are being redirected from food to fuel. (Total worldwide grain production for 2007 was just over 2000 million tons.) As farmers devoted larger parts of their crops to fuel production than in previous years, land and resources available for food production were reduced correspondingly.

This has resulted in less food available for human consumption, especially in developing and least developed countries, where a family's daily allowances for food purchases are extremely limited. The crisis can be seen, in a sense, to dichotomize rich and poor nations, since, for example, filling a tank of an average car with biofuel, amounts to as much maize (Africa's principal food staple) as an African person consumes in an entire year.

Brazil, the world's second largest producer of ethanol after the US, is considered to have the world's first sustainable biofuels economy and its government claims Brazil's sugar cane based ethanol industry has not contributed to the 2008 food crises. A World Bank policy research working paper released in July 2008 concluded that "...large increases in biofuels production in the United States and Europe are the main reason behind the steep rise in global food prices", and also stated that "Brazil's sugar-based ethanol did not push food prices appreciably higher". An economic assessment published in July 2008 by the OECD disagrees with the World Bank report regarding the negative effects of subsidies and trade restrictions, finding that the effect of biofuels on food prices are much smaller.

A report released by Oxfam ( Oxford Committee for Famine Relief)in June 2008 criticized biofuel policies of rich countries and concluded that, of all biofuels available in the market, Brazilian sugarcane ethanol is "far from perfect" but it is the most favorable biofuel in the world in term of cost and GHG balance. The report discusses some existing problems and potential risks and asks the Brazilian government for caution to avoid jeopardizing its environmental and social sustainability. The report also says that: "Rich countries spent up to $15 billion last year supporting biofuels while blocking cheaper Brazilian ethanol, which is far less damaging for global food security." (See Ethanol fuel in Brazil)

German Chancellor Angela Merkel said the rise in food prices is due to poor agricultural policies and changing eating habits in developing nations, not biofuels as some critics claim. On 29 April 2008, US President George W. Bush declared during a press conference that "85 percent of the world's food prices are caused by weather, increased demand and energy prices", and recognized that "15 percent has been caused by ethanol". On 4 July 2008, The Guardian reported that a leaked World Bank report estimated the rise in food prices caused by biofuels to be 75%. This report was officially released in July 2008.

Since reaching record high prices in June 2008, corn prices fell 50% by October 2008, declining sharply together with other commodities, including oil. As ethanol production from corn has continued at the same levels, some have argued this trend shows the belief that the increased demand for corn to produce ethanol was mistaken. "Analysts, including some in the ethanol sector, say ethanol demand adds about 75 cents to $1.00 per bushel to the price of corn, as a rule of thumb. Other analysts say it adds around 20 percent, or just under 80 cents per bushel at current prices. Those estimates hint that $4 per bushel corn might be priced at only $3 without demand for ethanol fuel." These industry sources consider that a speculative bubble in the commodity markets holding positions in corn futures was the main driver behind the observed hike in corn prices affecting food supply.

Second- and third-generation biofuels (such as cellulosic ethanol and algae fuel, respectively) may someday ease the competition with food crops, as can grow on marginal lands unsuited for food crops, but these advanced biofuels require further development of farming practices and refining technology; in contrast, ethanol from maize uses mature technology and the maize crop can be shifted between food and fuel use quickly.

=== Biofuel subsidies in the US and the EU ===
The World Bank lists the effect of biofuels as an important contributor to higher food prices. The FAO/ECMB has reported that world land usage for agriculture has declined since the 1980s, and subsidies outside the United States and EU have dropped since the year 2004, leaving supply, while sufficient to meet 2004 needs, vulnerable when the United States began converting agricultural commodities to biofuels. According to the United States Department of Agriculture (USDA), global wheat imports and stocks have decreased, domestic consumption has stagnated, and world wheat production has decreased from 2006 to 2008.

In the United States, government subsidies for ethanol production have prompted many farmers to switch to production for biofuel. Maize is the primary crop used for the production of ethanol, with the United States being the biggest producer of maize ethanol. As a result, 23 percent of United States maize crops were being used for ethanol in 2006–2007 (up from 6 percent in 2005–2006), and the USDA expects the United States to use 81 million tons of maize for ethanol production in the 2007–2008 season, up 37 percent. This not only diverts grains from food, but it diverts agricultural land from food production.

Nevertheless, supporters of ethanol claim that using corn for ethanol is not responsible for the worst food riots in the world, many of which have been caused by the price of rice and oil, which are not affected by biofuel use but rather by supply and demand.

However, a World Bank policy research working paper released in July 2008 says that biofuels have raised food prices between 70 and 75 percent. The study found that higher oil prices and a weak dollar explain 25–30% of total price rise. The "month-by-month" five-year analysis disputes that increases in global grain consumption and droughts were responsible for price increases, reporting that this had had only a marginal effect and instead argues that the EU and US drive for biofuels has had by far the biggest effect on food supply and prices. The paper concludes that increased production of biofuels in the US and EU were supported by subsidies and tariffs on imports, and considers that without these policies, price increases would have been smaller. This research also concluded that Brazil's sugar cane based ethanol has not raised sugar prices significantly, and suggest to remove tariffs on ethanol imports by both the US and EU, to allow more efficient producers such as Brazil and other developing countries to produce ethanol profitably for export to meet the mandates in the EU and the US.

The Renewable Fuel Association (RFA) published a rebuttal based on the version leaked before the formal release of the World Bank's paper. The RFA critique considers that the analysis is highly subjective and that the author "estimates the effect of global food prices from the weak dollar and the direct and indirect effect of high petroleum prices and attributes everything else to biofuels".

An economic assessment report also published in July 2008 by the OECD agrees with the World Bank report regarding the negative effects of subsidies and trade restrictions, but found that the effect of biofuels on food prices are much smaller. The OECD study is also critical of the limited reduction of GHG emissions achieved from biofuels produced in Europe and North America, concluding that the current biofuel support policies would reduce greenhouse gas emissions from transport fuel by no more than 0.8 percent by 2015, while Brazilian ethanol from sugar cane reduces greenhouse gas emissions by at least 80 percent compared to fossil fuels. The assessment calls on governments for more open markets in biofuels and feedstocks to improve efficiency and lower costs.

=== Idled farmland ===
According to the New York Times on 9 April 2008, the United States government pays farmers to idle their cropland under a conservation program. This policy reached a peak of 36,800,000 acres (149,000 km^{2}) idled in 2007, that is 8% of cropland in the United States, representing a total area bigger than the state of New York.

=== Agricultural subsidies ===
The global food crisis has renewed calls for removal of distorting agricultural subsidies in developed countries. Support to farmers in OECD countries totals US$280 billion annually, which compares to official development assistance of just US$80 billion in 2004, and farm support depresses global food prices, according to OECD estimates. These agricultural subsidies lead to underdevelopment in rural developing countries, including the least developed countries; meanwhile subsidised food increases overconsumption in developed countries. The US Farm Bill brought in by the Bush Administration in 2002 increased agricultural subsidies by 80% and cost the US taxpayer US$190 billion. In 2003, the EU agreed to extend the Common Agricultural Policy until 2013. Former UNDP Administrator Malloch Brown renewed calls for reform of the farm subsidies such as the CAP.

=== Distorted global rice market ===
Japan is forced to import more than 767,000 tons of rice annually from the United States, Thailand, and other countries due to WTO rules. Japan is not allowed to re-export this rice to other countries without approval. This rice is generally left to rot and then used for animal feed. Under pressure, the United States and Japan are poised to strike a deal to remove such restrictions. It is expected 1.5 million tons of high-grade American rice will enter the market soon.

=== Crop shortfalls from natural disasters ===
Several distinct weather- and climate-related incidents have caused disruptions in crop production. Perhaps the most influential is the extended drought in Australia, in particular the fertile Murray-Darling Basin, which produces large amounts of wheat and rice. The drought has caused the annual rice harvest to fall by as much as 98% from pre-drought levels.

Australia is historically the second-largest exporter of wheat after the United States, producing up to 25 million tons in a good year, the vast majority for export. However, the 2006 harvest was 9.8 million. Other events that have negatively affected the price of food include the 2006 heat wave in California's San Joaquin Valley, which killed large numbers of farm animals, and unseasonable 2008 rains in Kerala, India, which destroyed swathes of grain. These incidents are consistent with the effects of climate change.

The effects of Cyclone Nargis on Burma in May 2008 caused a spike in the price of rice. Burma has historically been a rice exporter, though yields have fallen as government price controls have reduced incentives for farmers. The storm surge inundated rice paddies up to 30 miles (48 km) inland in the Irrawaddy Delta, raising concern that the salt could make the fields infertile. The FAO had previously estimated that Burma would export up to 600,000 tons of rice in 2008, but concerns were raised in the cyclone's aftermath that Burma may be forced to import rice for the first time, putting further upward pressure on global rice prices.

Stem rust reappeared in 1998 in Uganda (and possibly earlier in Kenya) with the particularly virulent UG99 fungus. Unlike other rusts, which only partially affect crop yields, UG99 can bring 100% crop loss. Up to 80% yield losses were recently recorded in Kenya.

As of 2005 stem rust was still believed to be "largely under control worldwide except in Eastern Africa". But by January 2007 an even more virulent strain had gone across the Red Sea into Yemen. FAO first reported on 5 March 2008 that Ug99 had now spread to major wheat-growing areas in Iran.

These countries in North Africa and Middle East consume over 150% of their own wheat production; the failure of this staple crop thus adds a major burden on them. The disease is now expected to spread over China and the Far-East. The strong international collaboration network of research and development that spread disease-resistant strains some 40 years ago and started the Green Revolution, known as CGIAR, was since slowly starved of research funds because of its own success and is now too atrophied to swiftly react to the new threat.

=== Soil and productivity losses ===
Sundquist points out that large areas of croplands are lost year after year, due mainly to soil erosion, water depletion and urbanisation. According to him "60,000 km^{2}/year of land becomes so severely degraded that it loses its productive capacity and becomes wasteland", and even more are affected to a lesser extent, adding to the crop supply problem.

Additionally, agricultural production is also lost due to water depletion. Northern China in particular has depleted much of its non-renewables aquifers, which now impacts negatively its crop production.

Urbanisation is another, smaller, difficult to estimate cause of annual cropland reduction.

=== Rising levels of ozone ===
One possible environmental factor in the food price crisis is rising background levels of ground-level tropospheric ozone in the atmosphere. Plants have been shown to have a high sensitivity to ozone levels, and lower yields of important food crops, such as wheat and soybeans, may have been a result of elevated ozone levels. Ozone levels in the Yangtze Delta were studied for their effect on oilseed rape, a member of the cabbage family that produces one-third of the vegetable oil used in China. Plants grown in chambers that controlled ozone levels exhibited a 10–20 percent reduction in size and weight (biomass) when exposed to elevated ozone levels. Production of seeds and oil was also reduced. The Chinese authors of this study also reported that rice grown in chambers that controlled ozone levels exhibited a 14 to 20 percent reduction in biomass yield when exposed to ozone levels over 25 times higher than was normal for the region.

== Rising prices ==
From the beginning of 2007 to early 2008, the prices of some of the most basic international food commodities increased dramatically on international markets. The international market price of wheat doubled from February 2007 to February 2008 hitting a record high of over US$10 a bushel. Rice prices also reached ten-year highs. In some nations, milk and meat prices more than doubled, while soy (which hit a 34-year high price in December 2007) and maize prices have increased dramatically.

Total food import bills rose by an estimated 25% for developing countries in 2007. Researchers from the Overseas Development Institute have suggested this problem will be worsened by a likely fall in food aid. As food aid is programmed by budget rather than volume, rising food prices mean that the World Food Programme (WFP) needs an extra $500 million just to sustain the current operations.

To ensure that food remains available for their domestic populations and to combat dramatic price inflation, major rice exporters, such as China, Brazil, India, Indonesia, Vietnam, Cambodia and Egypt, imposed strict export bans on rice. Conversely, several other nations, including Argentina, Ukraine, Russia, and Serbia either imposed high tariffs or blocked the export of wheat and other foodstuffs altogether, driving up prices still further for net food importing nations while trying to isolate their internal markets. North Korea suffered from the food crisis to such extent that a North Korean official was quoted in June '08 with saying "Life is more than difficult. It seems that everyone is going to die". This nation however is solely relying on food assistance to cope with the crisis.

=== In developed countries ===
==== United States ====
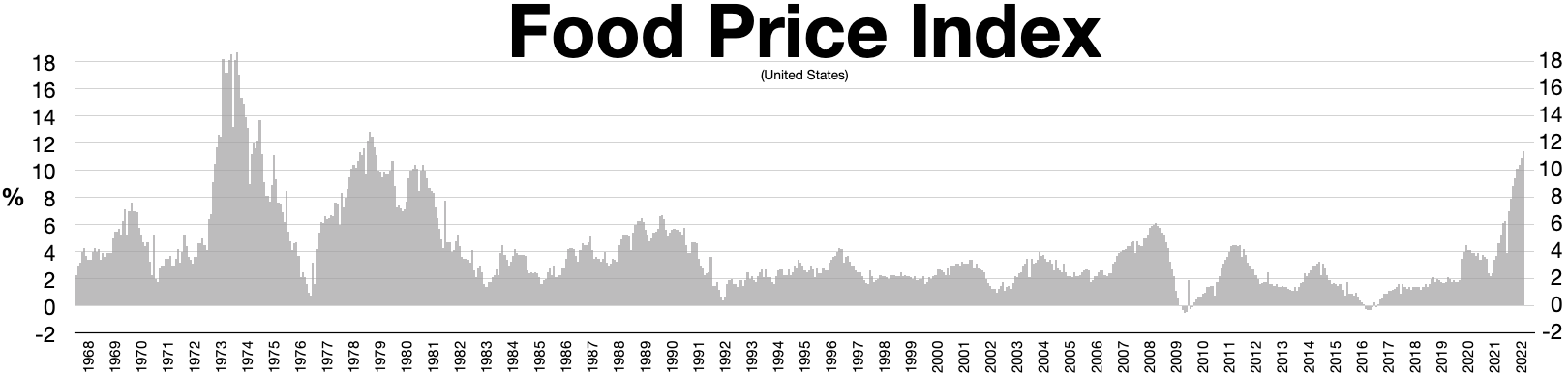
Food Price Index US

A May 2008 national survey found that food banks and pantries across the US were being forced to cut back on food distribution as 99 percent of respondents reported an increase in the number of people requesting services. Rising food and fuel prices, inadequate food stamp benefits, unemployment, underemployment, and rent or mortgage costs were factors reported as forcing an average of 15–20 percent more people. Compounding this issue, USDA bonus foods have declined by $200 million and local food donations were down nationally about 9 percent over the same period. According to the California Association of Food Banks, which is an umbrella organization of nearly all food banks in the state, food banks are at the "beginning of a crisis".

== Effects on farmers ==
If global price movements are transmitted to local markets, farmers in the developing world could benefit from the rising price of food. According to researchers from the Overseas Development Institute, this may depend on farmers' capacity to respond to changing market conditions. Experience suggests that farmers lack the credit and inputs needed to respond in the short term. In the medium or long term, however, they could benefit, as seen in the Asian Green Revolution or in many African countries in the recent past.

=== Relationship with 2008 Chinese milk scandal ===
As grain prices increased, China's numerous small-holding milk farmers, as well as producers of feed for cattle, were unable to exist economically. As a result, they turned to putting additives into the feed and milk, including melamine, to boost the measured level of protein. Hundreds of thousands of children became ill, China's milk exports virtually ended, executives and officials were arrested and some executed, and companies went bankrupt.

== Unrest and government actions in individual countries and regions ==
The price rises affected parts of Asia and Africa particularly severely with Burkina Faso, Cameroon, Senegal, Mauritania, Côte d'Ivoire, Egypt and Morocco seeing protests and riots in late 2007 and early 2008 over the unavailability of basic food staples. Other countries that have seen food riots or are facing related unrest are: Mexico, Bolivia, Yemen, Uzbekistan, Bangladesh, Pakistan, Sri Lanka, and South Africa.

=== Tunisia ===
Popular protests plagued Gafsa and other rural towns in the country of Tunisia in 2008 against the deaths of two miners and high unemployment rates in the government. Anti-government riots were suppressed and two people died. Unemployed demonstrators and food shortages protests erupted in towns near Gafsa in inspiration but was suppressed harshly.

=== Morocco ===
A popular movement unfolded as a series of violent at times but nonviolent demonstrations and events throughout Morocco in 2007–2008 after strikes took place. Unfortunately, during riots in Sidi Ifni, 10 demonstrators died after police cursed the protests in June 2008. In November–December, a wave of strikes and protests and violence hit the country as scattered protests broke out against food prices and shortages. The movement was quelled violently with a swift response by the authorities.

=== Bangladesh ===
10,000 workers rioted close to the Bangladeshi capital Dhaka, smashing cars and buses and vandalising factories in anger at high food prices and low wages. Dozens of people, including at least 20 police officials, were injured in the violence. Ironically, the country achieved food self-sufficiency in 2002, but food prices increased drastically due to the reliance of agriculture on oil and fossil fuels.

Economists estimate 30 million of the country's 150 million people could go hungry.

=== Brazil ===
In April 2008, the Brazilian government announced a temporary ban on the export of rice. The ban was intended to protect domestic consumers.

=== Burkina Faso ===
One of the earlier food riots took place in Burkina Faso, on 22 February, when rioting broke out in the country's second and third largest cities over soaring food prices (up to a 65 percent increase), sparing the capital, Ouagadougou, where soldiers were mobilized throughout strategic points. The government promised to lower taxes on food and to release food stocks. Over 100 people were arrested in one of the towns. Related policy actions of the Burkinabe government included:

- The removal of customs duty on rice, salt, dairy-based products and baby foods
- The removal of value added tax on durum wheat, baby foods, soap and edible oils
- Establishing negotiated prices with wholesalers for sugar, oil and rice
- Releasing food stocks
- Strengthening of community grain banks
- Food distribution in-kind
- Reduction of electricity cost, partial payment of utility bills for the poor
- Enacting special programs for schools and hospitals
- Fertilizer distribution and production support.

A ban was also imposed on exportation of cereals.

=== Cameroon ===
Cameroon, the world's fourth largest cocoa producer, saw large scale rioting in late February 2008 in Douala, the country's commercial capital. Protesters were against inflating food and fuel prices, as well as the attempt by President Paul Biya to extend his 25-year rule. Protesters set up barricades, burned tires, and targeted businesses that they believed belonged to the Biya family, high members of the ruling party, the government, or France. It became the first protest in the nation's history in which minute- by-minute events were covered by social media. By 27 February, a strike was taking place in thirty-one cities, including Yaoundé, Douala, Bamenda, Bafoussam, Buea, Limbe, Tiko, Muea, Mutengene, and Kumba. At least seven people were killed in the worst unrest seen in the country in over fifteen years. This figure was later increased to 24. Youths were mobilized in ways that had not been seen since the days of the villes mortes. Part of the government response to the protests was a reduction in import taxes on foods including rice, flour, and fish. The government reached an agreement with retailers by which prices would be lowered in exchange for the reduced import taxes. As of late April 2008, however, reports suggested that prices had not eased and in some cases had even increased.

On 24 April 2008, the government of Cameroon announced a two-year emergency program designed to double Cameroon's food production and achieve food self-sufficiency.

=== Côte d'Ivoire ===
On 31 March, Côte d'Ivoire's capital Abidjan saw police use tear gas and a dozen protesters injured following food riots that gripped the city. The riots followed dramatic hikes in the price of food and fuel, with the price of beef rising from US$1.68 to $2.16 per kilogram, and the price of gasoline rising from $1.44 to $2.04 per liter, in only three days.

=== Egypt ===
In Egypt, a boy was killed from a gunshot to the head after Egyptian police intervened in violent demonstrations over rising food prices that gripped the industrial city of Mahalla on 8 April 2008. Large swathes of the population have been hit as food prices, and particularly the price of bread, have doubled over the last several months as a result of producers exploiting a shortage that has existed since 2006.

=== Ethiopia ===
Drought and the food price crisis threatened thousands in Ethiopia.

=== Haiti ===
On 12 April 2008, the Haitian Senate voted to dismiss Prime Minister Jacques-Édouard Alexis after violent food riots hit the country. The food riots caused the death of five people. Prices for food items such as rice, beans, fruit and condensed milk have gone up 50 percent in Haiti since late 2007 while the price of fuel has tripled in only two months. Riots broke out in April due to the high prices, and the government had been attempting to restore order by subsidizing a 15 percent reduction in the price of rice.

=== India ===
India exports two kinds of rice: common and higher quality basmati. In October 2007, the country imposed a minimum export price on common rice in order to increase domestic stocks by reducing exports. In December 2007, they had raised the price, but exports had not declined. Consequently, in March 2008, the government banned the export of common rice. In response to criticism from some rice-importing countries, India made exceptions to allow exports to neighbors Bangladesh and Bhutan and some low-income African countries, but a limited amount was actually exported. The export ban was lifted in September 2011.

=== Indonesia ===
Street protests over the price of food took place in Indonesia where food staples and gasoline have nearly doubled in price since January 2008.

=== Latin America ===
In April 2008, the Latin American members of the United Nations' FAO met in Brasília to confront the issues of high food prices, scarcities and violence that affect the region.

=== Mexico ===
The president of Mexico, Felipe Calderón, with industry representatives and members of the Confederation of Industrial Chambers (Concamin), agreed to freeze prices of more than 150 consumer staples, such as coffee, sardines, tuna, oil, soup or tea, among others, until the end of December 2008. The measure was carried out in an attempt to control inflation, which stood at an annual rate of 4.95%, the highest increase since December 2004.

Mexican baking company Grupo Bimbo's CEO, Daniel Servitje, announced in the 19th Plenary Meeting of the Mexico–China Business Committee that Bimbo agreed to freeze their product prices, despite a 20% rise in production costs. Bimbo is one of the most important baking companies worldwide, having recently expanded to China. Bimbo has also acquired five bakeries in the United States and Canada.

=== Mozambique ===
In mid February, rioting that started in the Mozambican rural town of Chokwe and then spread to the capital, Maputo, has resulted in at least four deaths. The riots were reported in the media to have been, at least in part, over food prices and were termed "food riots". A biofuel advocacy publication, however, claimed that these were, in fact, "fuel riots", limited to the rise in the cost of diesel, and argued that the "food riot" characterization worked to fan "anti-biofuels sentiment".

=== Pakistan ===
The Pakistan Army has been deployed to avoid the seizure of food from fields and warehouses. This hasn't stopped the food prices from increasing. The new government has been blamed for not managing the countries food stockpiles properly.

=== Myanmar ===
Once the world's top rice producer, has produced enough rice to feed itself until now. Rice exports dropped over four decades from nearly 4 million tons to only about 40,000 tons last year, mostly due to neglect by Myanmar's ruling generals of infrastructure, including irrigation and warehousing. On 3 May 2008 Cyclone Nargis stripped Myanmar's rice-growing districts, ruining large areas with salt water. U.N. Food and Agriculture Organization estimates that these areas produce 65 percent of Myanmar's rice. Worries of long-term food shortages and rationing are rife. The military regime says nothing about the rice crisis, but continues to export rice at the same rate. "...at least the next two harvests are going to be greatly affected and there'll be virtually no output from those areas during that time. So we're likely to see considerable food and rice shortages for the next couple of years. The damage to the economy is going to be profound." said economist and Myanmar expert Sean Turnell, of Australia's Macquarie University. (interviewed in "The Irriwaddy", Tuesday, 27 May 2008)

On 22 February 2007, a small group of individuals protested the current state of consumer prices in the country. On 15 August 2007 the government removed subsidies on fuel causing a rapid and unannounced increase in prices. Protests grew into what became known as the Saffron Revolution.

=== Panama ===
In Panama, in response to higher rice prices the government began buying rice at the high market price and selling rice to the public at a lower subsidized price at food kiosks.

=== Philippines ===
In the Philippines, the Arroyo government insisted on 13 April that there would be no food riots in the country and that there could be no comparison with Haiti's situation. Chief Presidential Legal Counsel, Sergio Apostol stated that: "Haiti is not trying to solve the problem, while we are doing something to address the issue. We don't have a food shortage. So, no comparison..." Comments by the Justice Secretary, Raul Gonzalez, the following day, that food riots are not far fetched, were quickly rebuked by the rest of the government.

On 15 April, the Philippines, the world's largest rice importer, urged China, Japan, and other key Asian nations, to convene an emergency meeting, especially taking issue with those countries' rice export bans. "Free trade should be flowing", Philippine Agriculture Secretary Arthur Yap stated. In late April 2008, the Philippines government requested that the World Bank exert pressure on rice exporting countries to end export restrictions.

=== Russia ===
The Russian government pressured retailers to freeze food prices before key elections for fear of a public backlash against the rising cost of food in October 2007. The freeze ended on 1 May 2008.

=== Senegal ===
On 31 March 2008, Senegal had riots in response to the rise in the price of food and fuel. Twenty-four people were arrested and detained in a response that one local human rights group claimed included "torture" and other "unspeakable acts" on the part of the security forces. Further protests took place in Dakar on 26 April 2008.

=== Somalia ===
Riots in Somalia occurred on 5 May 2008 over the price of food, in which five protesters were killed. The protests occurred amid a serious humanitarian emergency due to the Ethiopian war in Somalia.

=== Tajikistan ===
In 2008, The Christian Science Monitor, neweurasia, and other media observers predicted that a nascent hunger crisis would erupt into a full famine as a consequence of energy shortages at the time. UN experts announced on 10 October that almost one-third of Tajikistan's 6.7 million inhabitants were at risk of running out of food during the winter of 2008–09.

=== Yemen ===
Food riots in southern Yemen that began in late March and continued through early April, saw police stations torched, and roadblocks were set up by armed protesters. The army has deployed tanks and other military vehicles. Although the riots involved thousands of demonstrators over several days and over 100 arrests, officials claimed no fatalities; residents, however, claimed that at least one of the fourteen wounded people has died.

== Projections and early mitigation efforts ==
The FAO released a study in December 2007 projecting a 49 percent increase in African cereal prices, and 53 percent in European prices, through July 2008. In April 2008, the World Bank, in combination with the International Monetary Fund, announced a series of measures aimed at mitigating the crisis, including increased loans to African farmers and emergency monetary aid to badly affected areas such as Haiti. According to FAO director Jacques Diouf, however, the World Food Programme needed an immediate cash injection of at least $1700 million, far more than the tens of million-worth in measures already pledged. On 28 April 2008, the United Nations Secretary-General Ban Ki-moon established a Task Force on the Global Food Security Crisis under his chairmanship and composed of the heads of the United Nations specialized agencies, funds and programmes, Bretton Woods institutions and relevant parts of the UN Secretariat to co-ordinate efforts to alleviate the crisis.

== After the crisis ==
2013 research concluded that the spike was the result of an unusual combination of circumstances and prices in the future will be higher than before the spike, depending on oil prices, climate change, and future diets. WDM noted in 2010 that after the spike in prices in 2008, prices of wheat, maize and rice lowered but were still higher than before the crisis. The impacts of the spike on poor people were concentrated in low-income countries and may have been less severe than once thought, thanks to rising rural wages in some countries. The researchers called on developing countries to ensure good data on the key indicators of distress and to strengthen social protection, and on those involved in international development to continue increasing focus on reducing child malnutrition and stimulating agricultural development.

== Actions by governments ==
IFAD is making up to US$200 million available to support poor farmers boost food production in face of the global food crisis.

On 2 May 2008, US President George W. Bush said he was asking Congress to approve an extra $770 million funding for international food aid. On 16 October 2008, in a speech at a United Nations gathering on World Food Day, former US president Bill Clinton criticized the bipartisan coalition in Congress that blocked efforts to make some aid donations in cash rather than in food. Referring in part to policies that had pressured African governments to reduce subsidies for fertilizer and other agricultural inputs, Clinton also said:

We need the World Bank, the IMF, all the big foundations, and all the governments to admit that, for 30 years, we all blew it, including me when I was President. We were wrong to believe that food was like some other product in international trade, and we all have to go back to a more responsible and sustainable form of agriculture.

The release of Japan's rice reserves onto the market may bring the rice price down significantly. As of 16 May, anticipation of the move had already lowered prices by 14% in a single week.

On 30 April 2008, Thailand announced an agreement in principle to create the Organization of Rice Exporting Countries (OREC) with the potential to develop a price-fixing cartel for rice.

In June 2008 the FAO hosted a High-Level Conference on World Food Security, in which $1.2 billion in food aid was committed for the 75 million people in 60 countries hardest hit by rising food prices.

In June 2008, a sustained commitment from the G8 was called for by some humanitarian organizations.

== Food price decreases ==
In December 2008, the global economic slowdown, decreasing oil prices, and speculation of decreased demand for commodities worldwide brought about sharp decreases in the price of staple crops from their earlier highs. Corn prices on the Chicago Board of Trade dropped from US$7.99 per bushel in June to US$3.74 per bushel in mid-December; wheat and rice prices experienced similar decreases. The UN's Food and Agriculture Organization, however, warned against "a false sense of security", noting that the credit crisis could cause farmers to reduce plantings. FAO convened a World Summit on Food Security at its headquarters in Rome in November 2008, noting that food prices remained high in developing countries and that the global food security situation has worsened.

By early 2010, food prices had risen again to surpass the record highs of 2008. Some commentators saw this as the resumption of the price spike seen in 2007–08. Prices had dropped after good weather helped increase grain yields while demand had dropped due to the recession.

== See also ==
- 2000s commodities boom
- 2020s commodities boom
- Agreement on Agriculture
- Agribusiness
- World food crises (2022–2023)
