= Right to Food Guidelines =

- Signed: 2004

Full text
- Right to Food Guidelines at Wikisource

The Voluntary Guidelines to support the Progressive Realization of the Right to Adequate Food in the Context of National Food Security, also known as the Right to Food Guidelines, is a document adopted by the Food and Agriculture Organization of the United Nations in 2004, with the aim of guiding states to implement the right to food. It is not legally binding, but directed to states' obligations to the right to food under international law. In specific, it is directed towards States Parties to the International Covenant on Economic, Social and Cultural Rights (ICESCR) and to States that still have to ratify it.

== History ==
In 1945, the Food and Agriculture Organization of the United Nations (FAO) is founded.

In 1996, the FAO organises the 1996 World Food Summit, in Rome. It requested that the right to food be given a more concrete and operational content. This resulted in the Rome Declaration on World Food Security and the World Food Summit Plan of Action.

"We pledge our political will and our common and national commitment to achieving food security for all and to an ongoing effort to eradicate hunger in all countries, with an immediate view to reducing the number of undernourished people to half their present level no later than 2015."

In 1999, Committee on Economic, Social and Cultural Rights adopted General Comment No.12 'The Right to Adequate Food' and described the various State obligations derived from the ICESCR regarding the right to food. It places three types of obligation on States Parties: the obligation to respect, to protect and to fulfil the right to food (which includes the obligations to facilitate and to provide).

In 2002, at the World Food Summit in June, the FAO adopted the Declaration of the World Food Summit: five years later calling for the establishment of an intergovernmental working group to prepare a set of guidelines on the implementation of the right to food. In November, the FAO Council set up an Intergovernmental Working Group which drafts the Right to Food Guidelines.

In 2004 the Right to Food Guidelines are adopted by 187 Member States of the General Council of the FAO. The Guidelines build on international law and are a set of recommendations States have chosen on how to implement their obligations under Article 11 of the International Covenant on Economic, Social and Cultural Rights.

== Overview ==
The Food and Agriculture Organization summarised the Right to Food guidelines in six phases or aspects to realizing the right to food:

1. Providing basic prerequisites, such as: good governance, democracy, non-discriminating markets, engaging in a multi-stakeholder approach including the private sector and civil society, and allocating sufficient national financial resources to anti-hunger and poverty.
2. Provide an enabling environment by adopting relevant strategies and policies, such as: diverse and sustainable economic development in support of food security, adopting a legal “human-rights-based approach”, developing the relevant institutions, making access to natural secure and non-discriminatory, setting indicators for monitoring and evaluation.
3. Implementing a legal framework to enforce the right to food and the three state obligations of respecting, providing and fulfilling, such as: immediate and progressive implementation of policies, making states accountable, guaranteeing autonomous and independent human rights institutions, and educating in particular children and women.
4. Guaranteeing on the market the availability of food which is adequate and healthy.
5. Provide extra support for vulnerable populations, including providing food for those who do not have access to adequate food for reasons beyond their control. Measures include: implementing safety nets for the weakest.
6. Prepare for emergencies, man made or natural disasters, and obligations to provide international food aid.

== See also ==
- Right to food
