= High-Level Conference on World Food Security =

The High-Level Conference on World Food Security was a conference held in Rome on 3–5 June 2008 under the auspices of the Food and Agriculture Organization of the United Nations. Its formal name was "High-Level Conference on World Food Security: the Challenges of Climate Change and Bioenergy". The Conference followed Expert Meetings and Stakeholder Consultations held by the FAO between January and April 2008.

The conference focused on the world food price crisis, climate change and agriculture and food vs fuel issues. One major issue was whether to increase production of biofuels, or whether global increases in food prices made food production much more important. U.S. Agriculture Secretary Edward T. Schafer was among the participants. Discussions hit a snag over debates about language on trade embargoes and export restrictions. In the short time of the meeting, richer nations were not able to come to an agreement on changes to agriculture and trade policies as well as the use of biofuels.

== See also ==
- United Nations
- 2007–2008 world food price crisis
