= OREC =

Organisation of Rice Exporting Countries

Organisation of Rice Exporting Countries (OREC) is a proposed organisation of South-East Asian countries which would regulate rice. The group was expected to be made up of Cambodia, Laos, Myanmar, Thailand and Vietnam. The project came to international attention after remarks made publicly by Thailand's Prime Minister Samak Sundaravej on the 30th April 2008.

== History ==
A first unsuccessful attempt to coordinate prices for rice on world markets was made in 2002 at the occasion of a meeting of senior government officials from major rice exporting countries from ASEAN and India.

According to Cambodia's prime minister Hun Sen the five proposed members of OREC cartel will discuss the organisation at regional talks in October 2008.

In June 2008, due to objections from the Philippines and Asian Development Bank, Thailand scrapped the OREC proposal.

== Organisation ==
It is yet unclear whether the organisation's intention would be to create a rice price fixing cartel similar to that of the OPEC for petroleum. However, it can be assumed that some price coordination will be the objective given the coincidence of the announcement with rising world-market prices for rice and the fact that all prospective members are traditional rice producers with high current export levels or export potentials for rice. Statements by the involved countries in early May indicated that a price-fixing cartel would only serve to "worsen food security" and the organization's purpose is "to contribute to ensuring food stability, not just in an individual country but also to address food shortages in the region and the world".

The discussion on a political agenda appears to be of a programmatic nature at this early stage with only few political statements being made to the public. Thailand's prime minister Mr. Samak was quoted in the Thai newspaper The Nation as saying that, “We [OREC] don’t aspire to be like OPEC, but we hope to be just a group of five to help each other in trading rice on the world market”.

A few days later Cambodia's prime minister, in an attempt to allay fears in the region about the creation of rice exporting cartel, specified some of what he thinks may be the core principles of action of OREC, "[...] to contribute to ensuring food stability not just in individual countries but also to address food shortages in the region and the world.". He further added, "We shall not hoard (rice) and raise prices when there are shortages.", and that "[...]our friends in ASEAN should not be worried about creation of this association."

== Criticism ==
Philippines, the world's biggest rice importer, denounced the plans for the creation of OREC. Haruhiko Kuroda, president of the Asian Development Bank, opposed the organization's creation saying that it would be bad for both importers and exporters.

Critics predict that a cartel on rice may be to the economic detriment of those who initiate it since rice producing countries may be able to expand their land under cultivation in the medium to long term. Members of the cartel may thus lose today's rice export markets with governments pushing towards stronger national production in order to achieve food self-reliance. Controlling the supply-side on a world scale may be a difficult goal to achieve for OREC. Herein can be seen a major difference to the oil-cartel OPEC.

== Membership ==
- Cambodia
- Laos
- Myanmar
- Thailand
- Vietnam

== See also ==
- 2007-2008 world food price crisis
- Food security
- Rice
- Cartel
- OPEC
