= World Food Summit =

World Food Summits are convened by the Food and Agriculture Organization of the United Nations.

== 1974 World Food Conference ==
The first food summit, the "World Food Conference", took place in Rome in 1974.

== 1996 World Summit on Food Security ==
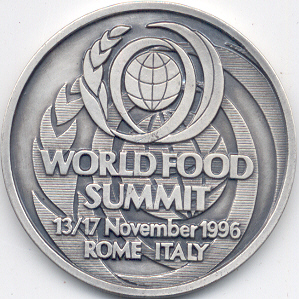
FAO Commemorative 1996 World Food Summit 3-piece set-Silver Obverse

The World Food Summit took place in Rome, Italy, between 13 and 17 November 1996. This resulted in the adoption of the Rome Declaration on World Food Security in which member states stated to "pledge our political will and our common and national commitment to achieving food security for all and to an ongoing effort to eradicate hunger in all countries, with an immediate view to reducing the number of undernourished people to half their present level no later than 2015."

== 2002 World Food Summit ==
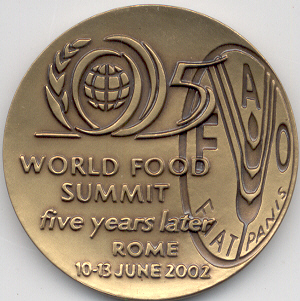
FAO Commemorative 2002 World Food Summit Bronze Obverse

In June 2002, at the World Food Summit in Rome, member nations adopted the Declaration of the World Food Summit: five years later, calling for the establishment of an intergovernmental working group to prepare a set of guidelines on the implementation of the right to food. This resulted in the drafting of the Right to Food Guidelines.

== 2009 World Summit on Food Security ==
The World Summit on Food Security took place in Rome, Italy, between 16 and 18 November 2009. The decision to convene the summit was taken by the FAO Council, at the proposal of FAO director-general Jacques Diouf. Sixty heads of state and governments attended the summit. Countries unanimously adopted a declaration pledging renewed commitment to eradicate hunger from the earth at the earliest possible date.

== 2021 World Food Summit ==
The 2021 World Food Summit will take place in New York City, United States, from 23 September 2021. The announcement to convene the summit in New York was made by United Nations secretary-general Antonio Guterres on World Food Day Oct. 16, 2020. The aim of the summit is to deliver progress on all 17 of the SDGs through a food systems approach.

== See also ==
- Food security
- Seed security
- Food sovereignty
- Right to food
