= Great Recession in the Americas =

North America was one of the focal points of the global Great Recession. While Canada has managed to return its economy nearly to the levels it enjoyed prior to the recession, the United States and Mexico are still under the influence of the worldwide economic slowdown. The cost of staple items dropped dramatically in the United States as a result of the recession.

== North America ==
=== United States ===
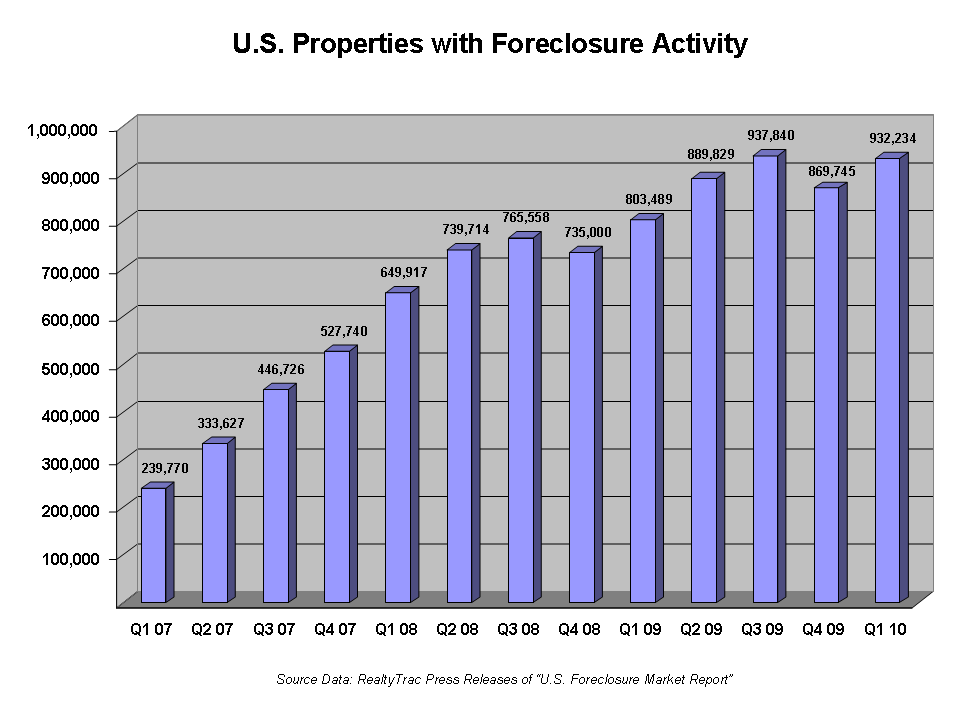
Number of U.S. household properties subject to foreclosure actions by quarter

The United States entered 2008 during a housing market correction, a subprime mortgage crisis and a declining dollar value. In February, 63,000 jobs were lost, a 5-year record. In September, 159,000 jobs were lost, bringing the monthly average to 84,000 per month from January to September 2008.

Federal reserve rates changes
Date	Discount rate change	New primary discount rate	New secondary discount rate	Fed funds rate change	New Fed funds rate
Apr 30, 2008	-.25%	2.25%	2.75%	-.25%	2.00%
Mar 18, 2008	-.75%	2.50%	3.00%	-.75%	2.25%
Mar 16, 2008	-.25%	3.25%	3.75%		
Jan 30, 2008	-.50%	3.50%	4.00%	-.50%	3.00%
Jan 22, 2008	-.75%	4.00%	4.50%	-.75%	3.50%

=== Canada ===
Canada was one of the last industrialized nations to enter into a downturn. GDP growth was negative in Q1, but positive in Q2 and Q3 of 2008. The recession officially started in Q4. The almost 1-year delay of the start of the recession in Canada relative to the U.S. is largely explained by two factors. First, Canada has a strong banking sector not weighed-down by the same degree of consumer-related debt issues that existed in the United States. The United States economy collapsed from within, while the Canadian economy was being hurt by its trade relationship with the United States. Second, commodity prices continued to rise through to June 2008, supporting a key component of the Canadian economy and delaying the start of recession. In early December 2008, the Bank of Canada, in announcing that it was lowering its central bank interest rate to the lowest level since 1958, also declared that Canada's economy was entering in recession. The Bank of Canada has since announced that it has two consecutive months of GDP decline (Oct -0.1% & Nov -0.7%). The country's unemployment rate could rise to 7.5% in the next two years, according to the latest OECD report.

On July 23, 2009, the Bank of Canada officially declared the recession to be over in Canada. However, the true economic recovery did not begin until November 30, 2009. The Canadian economy would expand at an annualized rate of 6.1% in the first quarter (January–April) of 2010, surpassing analyst expectations and marking the best growth rate since 1999. Economists had expected annualized GDP growth of 5.9% in the last quarter, up from 5% in last year's fourth quarter (September–December 2009). The growth in the first quarter is the third straight quarter of economic expansion in Canada, coming on the heels of three consecutive quarters of contraction. March growth came in at 0.6%, ahead of the 0.5% estimate. 215,900 new jobs have been created in the winter and early spring months of 2010 alone - in the traditional period of time where the Canadian economy is at its most stagnant.

Canada was also in a recession during the first two quarters of 2015 average both a decline of 0.1 percent of GDP.

=== Mexico ===
Despite the solid financial system of Mexico, the effects of the 2008 financial crisis impacted Mexico's export sector by a significant amount considering that 85% of the country's exports go to the United States. Reduced demand, the highest unemployment rate in almost a decade and the depreciation of the Mexican peso caused analysts to revise growth estimates officially from 1.8% to somewhere closer to 0% for 2008.

The recession did not show up until 2009, but the recession already slowed down in 2008. The country had a positive growth of 1.5% in 2008 compared to a 3.3% in 2007, by 2009 the economy had shrunk by 6.5%, a percentage bigger than that of the 1994-1995 crisis and the largest in almost eight decades and registering an inflation of 3.57%

Economic recovery from the historic downturn started in the late 2009 with exports rising 22.8 percent. The economic prospects for 2010 in the early 2009 were of a positive growth of 3.5 and some saw a steady recovery by the second quarter of 2010. At the end of 2010, the OECD revealed an estimated growth of 4.5 percent while the Mexican government estimated a growth of over 5 percent and the creation of 730 thousand jobs.

The estimated growth for 2011 range from 3.9 to 4.8. Despite the sustained growth in 2010, it was not enough to cover up the loss of 2009.

== South America ==
As it mainly consists of commodity exporters, South America was not directly affected by the financial turmoil, even if the bond markets of Brazil, Argentina, Colombia and Venezuela have been hit.

On the other hand, the continent experienced a tough agricultural crisis at the beginning of 2008. Food prices have increased a lot, due to a lack of arable land. One of the main reasons for the loss of agricultural land was the high value offered by the production of biofuels. Food prices, rising since 2002, ascended from 2006, reaching a peak during the first quarter of 2008. In one year the average price of food rose by about 50%.

Then South American countries were affected by both the global slowdown and the decrease in food prices due to the declining demand. In June 2008, the Economic Commission for Latin America and the Caribbean (ECLAC) declared it expected a 4% growth for 2009. However at the end of the year it predicted that the year 2009 would put an end to six years of prosperity during which Latin America has benefited from high raw materials prices. Production in the region is likely to decline and unemployment to increase. However, the Center for Economic and Policy Research has estimated that the region may be able to cope with the global downturn with the right macro-economic policies, as these countries no longer depend on the U.S. economy.

== See also ==
- American Recovery and Reinvestment Act of 2009
