= Declaration of the World Food Summit: five years later =

- Signed: 10–13 June 2002
- Location: Rome, Italy

Full text
- Declaration of the World Food Summit: five years later at Wikisource

The Declaration of the World Food Summit: five years later was adopted by governments at the 2002 World Food Summit that was convened by the Food and Agriculture Organization of the United Nations. Among others, the declaration calls for the establishment of an intergovernmental working group to prepare a set of guidelines on the implementation of the right to food, resulting in the drafting of the Right to Food Guidelines. It also unanimously adopted a declaration calling on the international community to fulfil an earlier pledge to cut the number of hungry people to about 400 million by 2015. That pledge was made at the original World Food Summit in 1996 - the largest-ever global gathering of leaders to address hunger and food security - and progress towards it remained disappointingly slow.

== See also ==
- Right to food
