= Seed security =

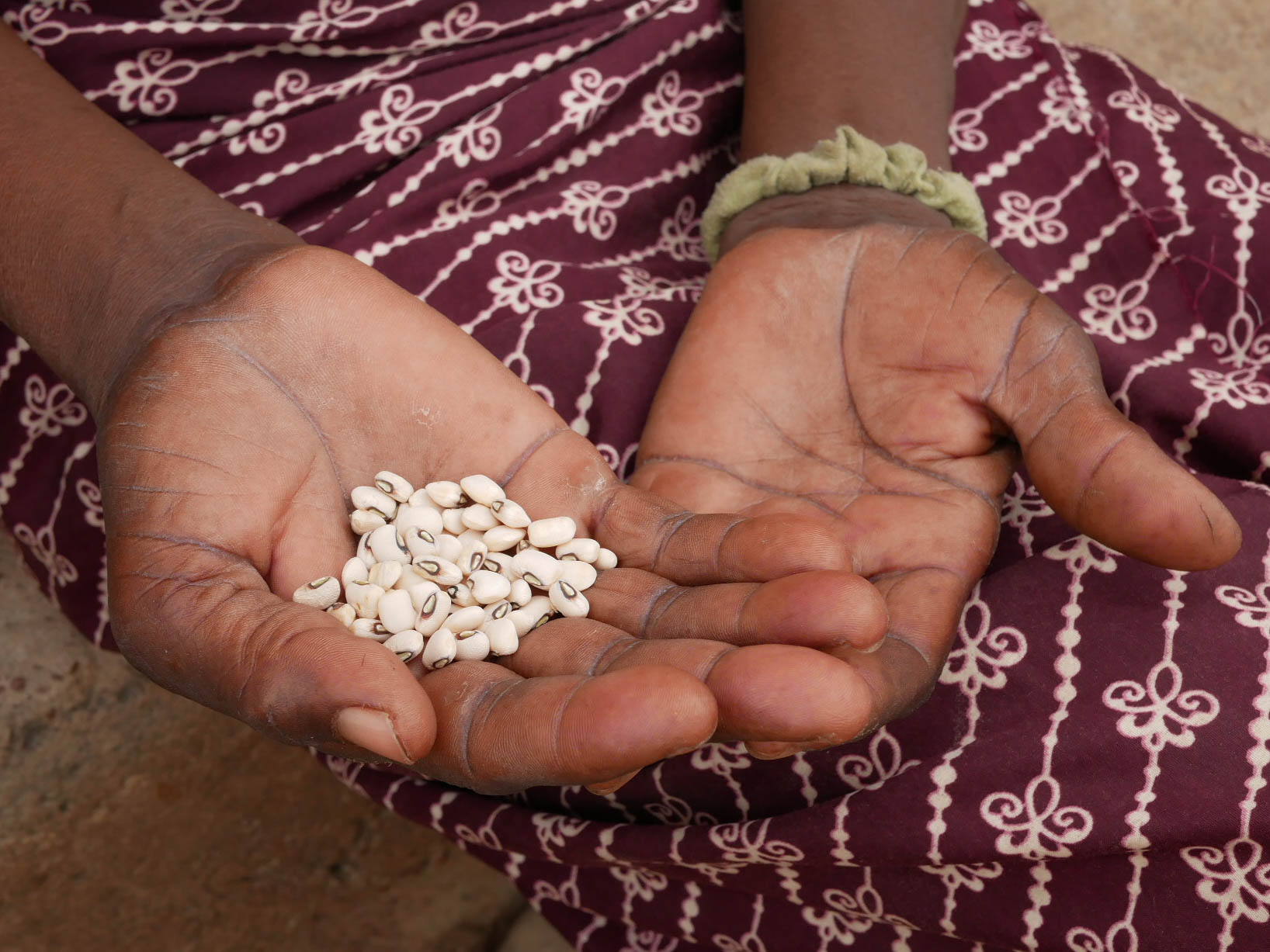
A woman's hands displaying cowpea seeds in Burkina Faso, photographed by Morgane Leclercq in 2019.

Seed security is a domain of food security that refers to a situation in which farmers have sustainable access, at the time of planting, to a sufficient quantity of high-quality seeds that are suited to their preferences. Households that are seed secure know that they will have the seed or planting material needed to cultivate their fields. This includes their ability to respond to potential disruptions such as droughts and floods, supply chain disturbances, economic instability, or war.

According to the definition established by the Food and Agriculture Organization of the United Nations (FAO), seed security exists when "men and women within the household have sufficient access to adequate quantities of good quality seed and planting materials of preferred crop varieties at all times in both good and bad cropping seasons." The four key parameters of seed security are availability, accessibility, quality and suitability.

Louise Sperling, research director of SeedSystem LLC, offers another definition of being seed secure: “Farm families are ‘seed secure’ when they have access to seed of adequate quantity, of acceptable quality, and in time for planting… So fostering seed security contributes to food and livelihood security more generally.”

Seed security depends of the success of local farmers and indigenous peoples being able to support crop biodiversity, which begins with seed availability. Emergency seed — seed resources for survival or self-sufficiency, contributes to the definition of seed security — where support and access is available during emergencies of natural causes or otherwise.

== History ==
One year after the 1996 World Food Summit, the FAO organized an International Workshop on Seed Security for Food Security. During this workshop, it was formally recognized that farmers' ability to safeguard and secure their seed stocks and different plant varieties is of critical importance to food security. The connection between seed security and food security was highlighted, particularly in countries where subsistence agriculture predominates.

The seed security framework was later designed by Tom Remington, based on the food security framework parallel, and submitted in 1998 in a report to the United States Agency for International Development (USAID). This work was further refined and published in 2002 in a refereed article by Catholic Relief Services. The objective was to develop an assessment methodology to enhance the effectiveness of humanitarian aid. The seed security framework was designed to help humanitarian actors—including donors, aid agencies, and other stakeholders—diagnose and evaluate the seed requirements of farming communities affected by disasters.

The work on the seed security framework was notably extended by Louise Sperling and H. David Cooper in a reference document published in 2004 for a FAO workshop on improving the effectiveness and sustainability of seed aid. In this report, the authors reflect on the advantages and limitations of the framework in facilitating appropriate seed assistance interventions. They also distinguish between acute and chronic seed insecurity.

Louise Sperling and Shawn McGuire have practically used this seed security framework in a score of assessments to identify specific constraints on the ground in high stress situations.

The seed market today is largely controlled by major petrochemical companies. Corteva and Bayer are two companies that “provided more than half the U.S. retail seed sails of corn, soybean, and cotton” between 2018 and 2020. Recently, the crop seed industry has been concentrated, which the USDA attributes to the expansions of intellectual property rights in the 1970s and 1980s, which incentivized new biotechnology on seed traits and varieties. Companies created herbicide-tolerant and insect-resistant varieties of corn, soybeans, and cotton through genetic modification, and those companies later merged with pesticide and seed treatment producers. The four firms that control the majority of crop seed and agricultural chemical sales are Bayer, Corteva, ChemChina’s Syngenta, and BASF.

According to climate reporter Anna Guth, this corporate consolidation means that “for the modern farmer, seeds are easy to come by.” However, Guth points out, “depending on the crop, finding seeds that are not genetically engineered can be quite difficult.” Independent seed companies, which are gradually disappearing as seed corporations, typically do not patent their seeds, which allows customers to have the autonomy to save those seeds and breed plant varieties of their own. Large seed corporations force farmers to buy new genetically engineered seeds every year. For example, Dr. Vandana Shiva, an environmental scholar who works with famers in India, said, “Monsanto is killing the freedom of farmers of the world." Susan K. Sell, a scholar of intellectual property and international political economy says that the seed industry is “at the center of a complex political dynamic between stakeholders."

== Parameters ==
The seed security framework consists of four key parameters: availability, accessibility, quality and suitability. These parameters evolve over time and are interconnected.

=== Availability ===
Seed availability refers to the quantity of seeds in a given area, within a reasonable distance from farms, and available at critical times for sowing periods. This parameter encompasses both the spatial availability of seeds and their temporal availability, in line with the planting schedule (before, at the start of, during, or late in the planting season).

=== Accessibility ===
Seed accessibility is defined as the ability to acquire seeds through cash purchase, exchange, barter, loans, or by leveraging one's status or influence within a social network. It depends on whether individuals or groups have adequate income or other resources to obtain appropriate seeds and whether they have physical access to diverse seed sources.

=== Quality ===
Seed quality is evaluated through several attributes, including germination rate, physical purity, moisture content, and overall seed health. While seed quality can be assessed objectively, it also depends on farmers' perceptions and experiences. High-quality seeds must be physically sound, physiologically viable, and free from pests and diseases.

=== Varietal suitability ===
Suitability refers to the ability to obtain seeds of adapted and preferred varieties that align with the needs of all farmers. The desired characteristics may vary from one household to another or from one locality to another, but they often relate to aspects such as appearance, taste, aroma, cooking quality, and the economic return from the associated crop.

== Causes of seed insecurity ==
Seed insecurity can be caused by natural disasters such as droughts, floods, earthquakes and typhoons, which destroy farmers' fields as well as their other sources of seed supply. The consequences of these disasters are particularly severe in developing countries, where a significant portion of the population conserves part of their harvest to ensure their seed supply for the next planting season. In these countries, many farmers cannot afford to buy commercial seeds on the official market, due to factors such as high seed prices, limited access to markets, and a reliance on traditional seed-saving practices.

Seed insecurity can also result from wars and civil conflicts. Although international humanitarian law prohibits the use of starvation as a weapon of war—including the deliberate destruction of objects indispensable to the survival of the civilian population—such violations are common. As a result, farming communities are looted, their fields destroyed, and they face critical seed shortages as the planting season approaches, jeopardizing future harvests.

Climate change is an important cause of seed insecurity. Scholars such as Richard Ellis, a professor of Crop Production at the University of Reading, offer seed saving as an imperative measure to produce seeds that can adapt to climate changes. In addition to affecting the amount of food that can be produced, seed quality has been affected mainly by temperature changes. He argues that the future of farming depends on the ability of farmers to be able to select and breed the right varieties of seeds as climate change unfolds. This is especially a concern in the global south, where the supply of good quality and affordable seed are limited. The response to this includes a worldwide system of “seed libraries”, or genebanks, holding vast varieties of plants to “safeguard genetic diversity”. These are the resources that are conserved for future use, like “libraries of seeds”.

Climate change in the global south is exacerbated by factors like “security challenges, political upheaval, and displacement,” and the Covid-19 pandemic that make protective measures like seed security more difficult. Diffa, the southeast region of Niger, is home to farming communities that are confronting insecurity, conflict, and food supply shortages due to climate change. The International Rescue Committee Airbel Impact Lab’s research (2023) in the region found that “the unavailability and inaccessibility of high-quality climate-smart seed deteriorates the security of the seed system in Niger,” and has created significant problems such as “limited seed multiplication at the community level, post-harvest loss, a high rate of dependency on NGOs for seeds, and limited market access." These factors are compounded by erratic hydrological patterns, among other climate related phenomena. So, this case finds that this inaccessibility of improved seed varieties is an example of seed insecurity that is further exacerbated by environmental shocks.

== Emergency seed aid ==
Today, seeds represent a significant portion of humanitarian aid provided in emergency contexts. In addition to food aid, emergency seed aid helps restore the livelihoods of populations affected by disasters or conflicts and supports the recovery of agricultural systems in affected areas.

To effectively intervene in fragile states, donors, humanitarian agencies, and other stakeholders strive to assess seed systems holistically. Emergency seed aid relies on a structured evaluation method known as the Seed Systems Security Assessment (SSSA), developed by experts to ensure a comprehensive understanding of seed system vulnerabilities and needs,.

Moreover, decades of practical experience with seed security interventions have led to the emergence of Ten Guiding Principles for Good Seed Aid. These principles shape best practices across diverse contexts, providing essential guidance from assessment to implementation and evaluation to ensure interventions are both effective and contextually appropriate.

Ideally, seed aid should be gender-responsive and involve agricultural communities in decision-making. The needs and preferences of individuals, as well as barriers to market access, are carefully analyzed to design appropriate interventions. Farmers should have the freedom to choose between local or modern varieties, including indigenous, intermediate, and commercial crops.

According to Hodgkin et al. in a journal about agroecosystems, another important consideration for farmers during emergencies is being able to acquire seeds that will still be able to grow and thrive in the unique soil composition and climate of the region. This means that where seeds come from is important, so during emergencies such as droughts or floods, “farmers will travel to other villages with similar environmental conditions to exchange or buy seed." According to Samberg at al. farmers look at many attributes of seeds that would lessen chances of seed emergencies such as “yield in low-fertility conditions, resistance to pests and disease, inter annual stability of production,” and more. Therefore, the local market is an important source of seed, and farmers in remote areas who do not have access to nearby markets are more susceptible to seed insecurity, especially in emergency situations.

== Seed security and farmers' rights ==
Farmers’ seed rights are important to seed security because of the connection to the agricultural system. According to Norwegian Univ. of Life Sciences professors Ola T. Westengen, Sarah Paule Dalle, and Teshoma Hunduma Mulesca et al. (2023), “conservation of genetic resources, base-broadening, and breeding is crucial for introducing new traits for tolerance to stressors”, including but not limited to climate change. They argue that addressing the accessibility and institutional needs of small-scale farmers, especially those in developing countries, is what will increase crtop diversity. Farmers contribute greatly to this genetic crop diversity, which molecular analyses have shown to “increase productivity, regulate nutrient cycling and microclimate conditions, reduce temporal variability, and maintain resistance and resilience in the face of socioeconomic or environmental change."

In 2001, farmers worldwide were granted specific rights through a legally binding international text. Article 9 of the International Treaty on Plant Genetic Resources for Food and Agriculture (ITPGRFA) recognizes the following farmers' rights: the right to the protection of traditional knowledge, the right to fair and equitable benefit-sharing, and the right to participate in decision-making processes. The treaty also acknowledges that farmers' rights to save, use, exchange, and sell farm-saved seeds should not be restricted.

However, farmers' rights do not easily coexist with intellectual property rights (IPRs), as the latter impose limitations on the free use of seeds. IPRs allow innovators to exclude third parties from using a protected variety and/or to derive financial benefits from certain uses of the innovation. Since 1968, the International Convention for the Protection of New Varieties of Plants (UPOV Convention) has enabled breeders to obtain Plant Breeders' Rights (PBRs) for varieties that meet the criteria of distinctness, uniformity, and stability (DUS).

Intellectual property rights have granted exclusive ownership and control over genetic resources to corporations, universities, and research institutions—often without recognition, compensation, or protection of the contributions of rural communities. This practice, often referred to as biopiracy, has been widely criticized, notably by Indian activist Vandana Shiva.

According to Shiva, seed security is threatened by the globalization and privatization of the seed sector. She describes three major agricultural impacts that have been caused by the changes in the seed sector: a change in cropping patterns from mixed cultivation to monoculture of hybrids based on external inputs, different culture of agriculture which focuses on high profit without proper risk assessment, and a shift from a public sector approach to private.

More research in the public sector played a major role in the development of modern agriculture. Between 1971 and 1990, up to US$13.6 billion of the US$43 billion that newly introduced wheat varieties were worth are attributable to spillovers from public funded International Maize and Wheat Improvement Center. Essentially, the development of agriculture has been primarily invested in monoculture and genetic engineering of seeds through globalization and privatization, putting farmworkers at a major disadvantage.

According to The Center for Food Safety, the Monsanto Company has sued farmers and small farm businesses in at least 27 states, arguing that seed saving violates Monsanto’s patents, utilizing restrictive licensing agreements to sue farmers for suspected seed-saving. The claims made against this chemical company were: “Monsanto and its hired investigators continue to harass, intimidate and prosecute U.S. farmers, primarily in cases involving alleged saving and replanting of the company’s Roundup Ready soybeans”.

As of a 2023, as the Guardian’s south Asia Correspondent Hannah Ellis-Peterson reported in an article with Vandana Shiva, “more than 60% of the world’s commercial seeds are sold by just four companies, which have led the push to patent seeds, orchestrated a global monopoly of certain GM crops such as cotton and soya and sued hundreds of small-scale farmers for saving seeds from commercial crops.” In this article, Shiva refers to taking Monsanto to court as “going up against the mafia." Vandana Shiva works to show how farmer’s rights have been complicated by powerful corporate ownership and intellectual property rights that have concentrated the seed market.

In 2014, the Nagoya Protocol established an access and benefit-sharing (ABS) framework requiring States to regulate access to genetic resources through legally binding agreements between providers and users. A decade later, the WIPO Treaty on Intellectual Property, Genetic Resources, and Associated Traditional Knowledge introduced obligations aimed at enhancing transparency, effectiveness, and the quality of the patent system concerning genetic resources and traditional knowledge.

The seed security framework is useful for designing public policies and legislation adapted to agricultural, social and environmental challenges—both in crisis situations and under normal conditions. It supports research that is grounded in farmers' realities and broadens perspectives on national and international seed law. Additionally, it helps analyze fragmented legal frameworks, improving the clarity and predictability of seed-related regulations. A right to seeds has been recognized in Article 19 of the United Nations Declaration on the Rights of Peasants and Other People Working in Rural Areas (UNDROP), adopted on October 30, 2018.

This important recognition was made possible by the efforts of the peasant movement called La Via Campesina. Cristophe Golay, Coordinator of the Project on Economic, Social and Cultural Rights and Research Fellow at the Geneva Academy of International Humanitarian Law and Human Rights, wrote a background paper on the UN declaration of rights of peasants. Beginning in 1993, La Via Campesina’s main concern has been food sovereignty and defending the life, land, and dignity of peasant populations. Even, before the movements, work to add rights to the documents, the Declaration on the Rights of Peasants was described as “one of the most important developments in the protection against discrimination in the context of the right to food” by the UN. It follows the model of the United Nations Declaration on the Rights of Indigenous Peoples, reaffirming the existing civil political, economic, social, and cultural rights outlined, and reinforces them by incorporating new rights to land, seeds, and means of agricultural production. This is the first step for La Via Campesina that must be followed up with active participation by the movement and other representatives of civil society in UN conventions. Additionally, Olivier De Schutter, the UN Special Repporteur on the right to food underlined in many of his reports the need to better protect rights of peasant farming communities to seeds and land.

== Indigenous Seed Security ==
A central part of indigenous community cultures is their kinship relations to the human and non-human beings. Indigenous people have long preserved seeds because of the ties they have to their community. These relationships are tied to the land that a given people is indigenous to, that have been complicated throughout the expansive history of settler colonialism and displacement of indigenous people from their native lands. Kyle Powys White is an environmental scholar who has contributed to foundational scholarship on Indigenous communities and climate change.

Heirloom seeds, seed varieties that has been passed down, are unaltered by modern agricultural techniques and carefully kept from cross pollinating with others. In an article from the Cornucopia Institute, Judy Keen says, “Seed saving is a priority for many tribes. The White Earth Indian Reservation in northern Minnesota grows saved seeds. Native Seeds/SEARCH, a nonprofit group in Tucson, Ariz., has a seed bank with almost 2,000 varieties." For example, for thousands of years, the Meskwaki people, located in central Iowa, have growneaten a corn variety called a-ta-mi-ni, cultivated by their ancestors "by selecting plants that displayed desirable traits and crossing them with other well-performing plants." They then saved the seeds that were produced, which are the same that they use now, centuries later.

Seed insecurity disproportionately affects Indigenous people due to the displacement that many tribes have faced. When they are moved to new land (often less desirable land) in a new climate, those saved seeds may not grow well in the new climate, which effectively erases thousands of years of history that is passed down through heirloom crops. As Indigenous and climate justice scholar Kyle Powys Whyte states, “The forced adoption of English limits the range of meanings, knowledges and skill-sets that Indigenous persons can draw on for sustenance.” He also explains that, “Many Indigenous peoples in the 1830s were forcibly removed from their territories altogether to take up small pieces of reservation land or private property hundreds of miles away in different ecosystems and climate regions." Whyte’s history of displacement connects to Keen’s point that the historical resettlement of Indigenous peoples has disrupted the practices of seed saving that were a part of kinship relationship to their community.
