= List of countries by wheat production =

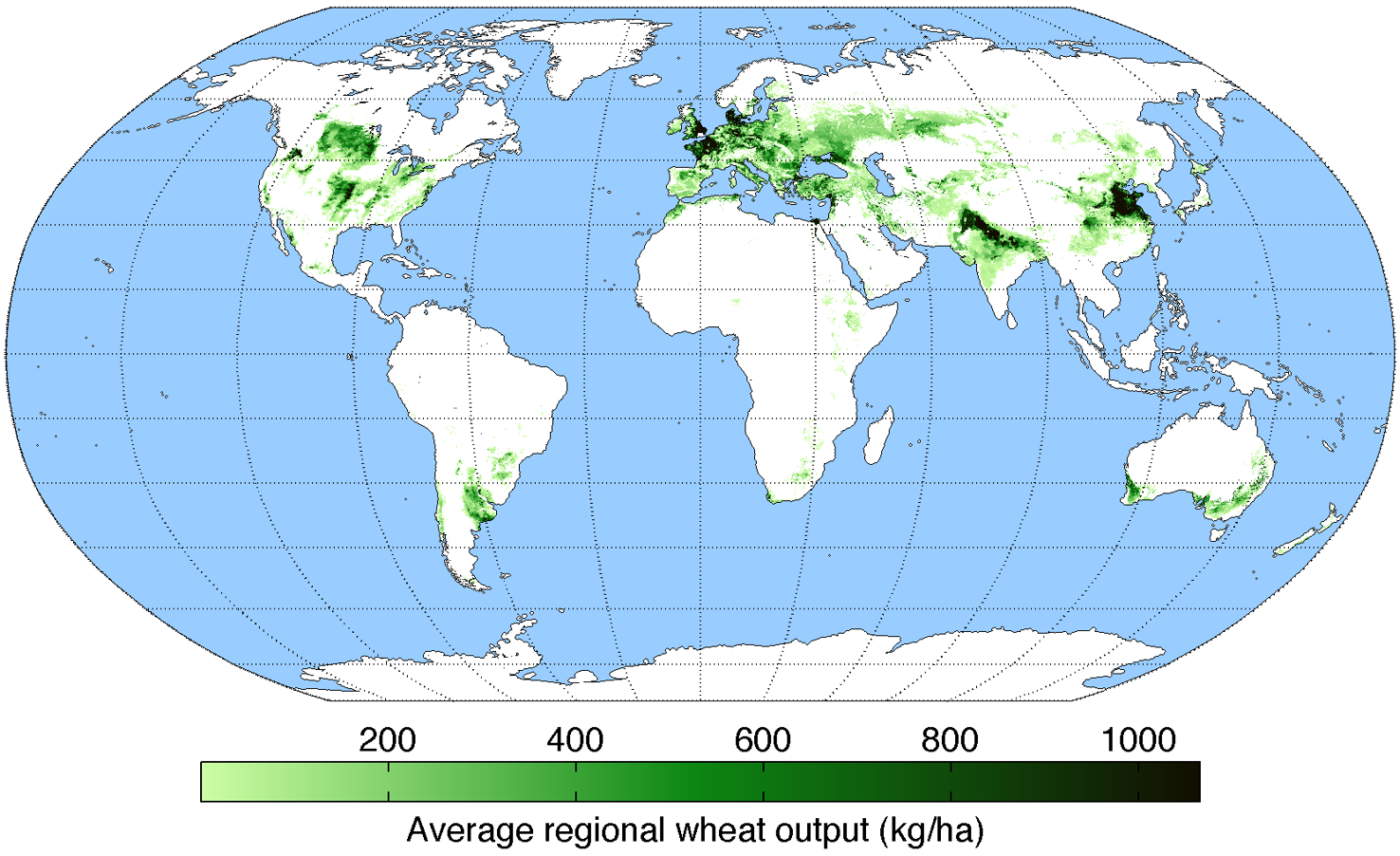
A map of worldwide wheat production in 2000

Wheat is one of the most widely produced primary crops in the world.

The following international wheat production statistics come from the Food and Agriculture Organization figures from FAOSTAT database, older from International Grains Council figures from the report "Grain Market Report".

The quantities of wheat in the following table are in million metric tonnes. All countries with a typical production quantity of at least 2 million metric tonnes are listed below.

== List ==
=== 2020s ===
Country	2022	2021	2020
World total	808.4	772.8	757.0
China	137.7	136.9	134.3
India	107.7	109.6	107.9
Russia	104.2	76.1	85.9
United States	44.9	44.8	49.8
Australia	36.2	31.9	14.5
France	34.6	36.6	30.2
Canada	34.3	22.4	35.4
Pakistan	26.2	27.5	25.2
Germany	22.6	21.5	22.2
Argentina	22.2	17.6	19.8
Ukraine	20.7	32.2	24.9
Turkey	19.8	17.7	20.5
Kazakhstan	16.4	11.8	14.3
United Kingdom	15.5	14.0	9.7
Poland	13.2	11.9	12.5
Brazil	10.3	7.9	6.3
Iran	10.0	10.1	10.4
Egypt	9.7	9.8	9.1
Romania	8.7	10.4	6.4
Ethiopia	7.0	5.8	5.5
Italy	6.6	7.3	6.7
Spain	6.5	8.6	8.1
Bulgaria	6.4	7.3	4.8
Uzbekistan	6.3	6.0	6.2
Czech Republic	5.2	5.0	4.9
Lithuania	4.5	4.2	4.8
Hungary	4.4	5.3	5.1
Denmark	4.2	4.0	4.1
Afghanistan	3.8	4.0	5.2
Mexico	3.6	3.3	3.0
Sweden	3.2	3.0	3.2
Serbia	3.1	3.4	2.9
Algeria	3.0	2.2	3.1
Iraq	2.8	4.2	6.2
Morocco	2.7	7.5	2.6
Latvia	2.5	2.4	2.7
Belarus	2.4	2.4	2.8
Nepal	2.1	2.1	2.2
South Africa	2.1	2.3	2.1
Slovakia	2.0	2.0	2.1

=== 2010s ===
Country	2019	2018	2017	2016	2015	2014	2013	2012	2011	2010
World total	764.1	732.4	772.9	748.4	741.8	728.8	710.2	673.7	696.9	640.8
China	133.6	131.4	134.2	133.3	132.6	126.2	121.9	121.0	117.4	115.2
India	103.6	99.9	98.5	92.3	86.5	95.9	93.5	94.9	86.9	80.8
Russia	74.5	72.1	86.0	73.3	61.8	59.7	52.1	37.7	56.2	41.5
United States	52.6	51.3	47.4	62.8	55.8	55.1	58.1	61.7	54.4	60.1
Australia	17.6	20.9	31.8	22.3	23.7	25.3	22.9	29.9	27.4	21.8
France	40.6	35.4	38.7	29.3	42.8	39.0	38.7	37.9	36.0	38.2
Canada	32.7	32.4	30.4	32.1	27.6	29.4	37.6	27.2	25.3	23.3
Pakistan	24.3	25.1	26.7	25.6	25.1	26.0	24.2	23.5	25.2	23.3
Germany	23.1	20.3	24.5	24.5	26.5	27.8	25.0	22.4	22.8	23.8
Argentina	19.5	18.5	18.4	11.3	13.9	9.2	8.1	14.7	16.1	9.0
Ukraine	28.4	24.7	26.2	26.1	26.5	24.1	22.3	15.8	22.3	16.9
Turkey	19.0	20.0	21.5	20.6	22.6	19.0	22.1	20.1	21.8	19.7
Kazakhstan	11.5	13.9	14.8	15.0	13.7	13.0	13.9	9.8	22.7	9.6
United Kingdom	16.2	13.6	14.8	14.4	16.4	16.6	11.9	13.3	15.3	14.9
Poland	10.8	9.6	11.7	10.8	11.0	11.6	9.5	8.6	9.3	9.4
Brazil	5.6	5.5	4.3	6.8	5.5	6.3	5.7	4.4	5.7	6.2
Iran	14.5	13.0	12.7	14.6	11.5	10.6	9.3	8.8	8.7	12.1
Egypt	8.6	8.3	8.4	9.3	9.6	8.8	9.5	8.8	8.4	7.2
Romania	10.3	10.1	10.0	8.4	8.0	7.6	7.3	5.3	7.1	5.8
Ethiopia	5.3	4.8	4.6	4.5	4.7	4.2	3.9	3.4	2.9	2.9
Italy	6.7	7.1	7.0	8.0	7.4	7.1	7.3	7.7	6.6	6.8
Spain	6.0	8.3	4.9	7.9	6.4	6.5	7.7	5.2	6.9	5.9
Bulgaria	6.3	6.0	6.1	5.7	5.0	5.3	5.5	4.5	4.5	4.1
Uzbekistan	6.1	5.4	6.1	6.9	7.0	7.0	6.8	6.6	6.5	6.7
Czech Republic	4.8	4.4	4.7	5.5	5.3	5.4	4.7	3.5	4.9	4.2
Lithuania	3.8	2.8	3.9	3.8	4.4	3.2	2.9	3.0	1.9	1.7
Hungary	5.4	5.3	5.2	5.6	5.3	5.3	5.1	4.0	4.1	3.7
Denmark	4.6	2.6	4.8	4.2	5.0	5.2	4.1	4.5	4.8	5.1
Afghanistan	4.9	3.6	4.3	4.6	4.7	5.4	5.2	5.1	3.4	4.5
Mexico	3.2	2.9	3.5	3.9	3.7	3.7	3.4	3.3	3.6	3.7
Sweden	3.5	1.6	3.3	2.8	3.3	3.1	1.9	2.3	2.3	2.1
Serbia	2.5	2.9	2.3	2.9	2.4	2.4	2.7	2.4	2.1	1.6
Algeria	3.9	4.0	2.4	2.4	2.7	2.4	3.3	3.4	2.9	2.6
Iraq	4.3	2.2	3.0	3.1	2.6	5.1	4.2	3.1	2.8	2.7
Morocco	4.0	7.3	7.1	2.7	8.1	5.1	6.9	3.9	6.0	4.9
Latvia	2.4	1.4	2.1	2.1	2.3	1.5	1.4	1.5	0.9	1.0
Belarus	2.3	1.8	2.6	2.3	2.9	2.9	2.1	2.6	2.1	1.7
Nepal	2.0	1.9	1.9	1.7	2.0	1.9	1.7	1.8	1.7	1.6
South Africa	1.5	1.9	1.5	1.9	1.4	1.8	1.9	1.9	2.0	1.4
Slovakia	1.9	1.9	1.8	2.4	2.1	2.1	1.7	1.3	1.6	1.2

=== 2000s ===
Country	2009	2008	2007	2006	2005	2004	2003	2002	2001	2000
World total	683.6	680.3	606.6	614.4	627.0	634.7	550.0	592.0	588.2	587.6
China	115.1	112.5	109.3	108.5	97.4	92.0	86.5	90.3	93.9	99.6
India	80.7	78.6	75.8	69.4	68.6	72.2	65.8	72.8	69.7	76.4
Russia	61.7	63.8	49.4	44.9	47.6	45.4	34.1	50.6	47.0	34.5
United States	60.4	68.0	55.8	49.2	57.2	58.7	63.8	43.7	53.0	60.6
Australia	21.4	13.6	10.8	25.2	21.9	26.1	10.1	24.3	22.1	24.8
France	38.3	39.0	32.8	35.4	36.9	39.7	30.5	38.9	31.5	37.4
Canada	26.9	28.6	20.1	25.3	25.7	24.8	23.0	16.0	20.6	26.5
Pakistan	24.0	21.0	23.3	21.3	21.6	19.5	19.2	18.2	19.0	21.1
Germany	25.2	26.0	20.8	22.4	23.7	25.4	19.3	20.8	22.8	21.6
Argentina	8.5	16.5	14.7	12.7	16.1	14.7	12.4	15.4	16.1	15.5
Ukraine	20.9	25.9	13.9	13.9	18.7	17.5	11.4	20.6	21.3	10.2
Turkey	20.6	17.8	17.2	20.0	21.5	21.0	19.0	19.5	19.0	21.0
Kazakhstan	17.1	12.5	16.5	13.5	11.2	9.9	11.5	12.7	12.7	9.1
United Kingdom	14.1	17.2	13.2	14.8	14.9	15.5	14.3	16.0	11.6	16.7
Poland	9.8	9.3	8.3	7.1	8.8	9.9	7.9	9.3	9.3	8.5
Brazil	5.1	6.0	4.1	2.5	4.7	5.8	6.2	3.1	3.4	1.7
Iran	12.1	7.0	15.9	14.7	14.3	14.6	13.4	12.5	9.5	8.1
Egypt	8.5	8.0	7.4	8.3	8.1	7.2	6.8	6.6	6.3	6.6
Romania	5.2	7.2	3.0	5.5	7.3	7.8	2.5	4.4	7.7	4.4
Ethiopia	3.1	2.3	2.5	2.2	2.2	1.6	1.6	1.4	1.6	1.2
Italy	6.5	8.9	7.2	7.2	7.7	8.6	6.2	7.5	6.4	7.5
Spain	4.8	6.7	6.4	5.5	4.0	7.1	6.3	6.8	5.0	7.3
Bulgaria	4.0	4.6	2.4	3.3	3.5	4.0	2.0	4.1	4.1	2.8
Uzbekistan	6.6	6.1	6.2	6.1	6.1	5.5	5.6	5.2	3.8	3.7
Czech Republic	4.4	4.6	3.9	3.5	4.1	5.0	2.6	3.9	4.5	4.1
Lithuania	2.1	1.7	1.4	0.8	1.4	1.4	1.2	1.2	1.1	1.2
Hungary	4.4	5.6	4.0	4.4	5.1	6.0	2.9	3.9	5.2	3.7
Denmark	5.9	5.0	4.5	4.8	4.9	4.8	4.7	4.1	4.7	4.7
Afghanistan	5.1	2.6	4.5	3.4	4.3	2.4	3.5	2.7	1.6	1.5
Mexico	4.1	4.0	3.5	3.4	3.0	2.3	2.7	3.2	3.3	3.5
Sweden	2.3	2.2	2.3	2.0	2.2	2.4	2.3	2.1	2.4	2.4
Serbia	2.1	2.1	1.9	1.9	2.7	2.8	1.4	2.3	2.5	2.3
Algeria	3.0	1.1	2.3	2.7	2.4	2.7	3.0	1.5	2.0	0.8
Iraq	1.7	1.3	2.2	2.1	2.2	1.8	2.3	2.6	0.9	0.4
Morocco	6.4	3.8	1.6	6.3	3.0	5.5	5.1	3.4	3.3	1.4
Latvia	1.0	1.0	0.8	0.6	0.7	0.5	0.5	0.5	0.5	0.4
Belarus	2.0	2.0	1.4	1.1	1.2	1.1	0.8	1.0	0.9	1.0
Nepal	1.3	1.6	1.5	1.4	1.4	1.4	1.3	1.3	1.2	1.2
South Africa	2.0	2.1	1.9	2.1	1.9	1.7	1.5	2.4	2.5	2.4
Slovakia	1.5	1.8	1.4	1.3	1.6	1.8	0.9	1.6	1.8	1.3
