= Rome Declaration on World Food Security =

1996 World Food Summit declaration in Rome reaffirming the human right to food

- Signed: 13 November 1996
- Location: Rome, Italy

Full text
- Rome Declaration on World Food Security at Wikisource

The Rome Declaration on World Food Security is a document adopted at the 1996 World Food Summit took place in Rome, Italy between 13 and 17 November 1996. The summit was organised by the Food and Agriculture Organization of the United Nations (FAO). The Declaration reaffirms the right of everyone to have access to safe and nutritious food consistent with the right to adequate food and the fundamental right of everyone to be free from hunger and pledges political will and common and national commitment to achieving food security for all and to an ongoing effort to eradicate hunger in all countries with an immediate view to reducing the number of undernourished people to half their present level no later than 2015. Therefore, the document has important significance in relation to Food security and the Right to food. Signatories commit to the implementation of the World Food Summit Plan of Action.

== Right to food ==
In the Declaration, member states stated the following in relation to the right to food:

"We pledge our political will and our common and national commitment to achieving food security for all and to an ongoing effort to eradicate hunger in all countries, with an immediate view to reducing the number of undernourished people to half their present level no later than 2015."
