= World Summit on Food Security 2009 =

Logo

The World Summit on Food Security took place in Rome, Italy between 16 and 18 November 2009. The decision to convene the summit was taken by the Council of the Food and Agriculture Organization of the United Nations (FAO) in June 2009, at the proposal of FAO Director-General Dr Jacques Diouf. Sixty Heads of State and Government and 192 ministers, from 182 countries and the European Community, attended the summit, which took place at FAO's headquarters.

== Context ==
The FAO says the global food security situation has worsened and continues to represent a serious threat. There are 1 billion chronically hungry people in the world and recent reports say this number could grow by 100 million in 2009. Food prices remain stubbornly high in developing countries, while the global economic crisis is aggravating the situation by affecting jobs and deepening poverty.

== Achievements ==
The Summit adopted unanimously a declaration committing all the nations of the world to eradicate hunger at the earliest possible date. It pledged to substantially increase aid to agriculture in developing countries, so that the world's 1 billion hungry can become more self-sufficient. The declaration confirmed the current target for reducing hunger by half by 2015. Countries agreed to work to reverse the decline in domestic and international funding for agriculture and promote new investment in the sector, to improve governance of global food issues in partnership with relevant stakeholders from the public and private sector, and to face the challenges of climate change to food security.

== Funding ==
FAO announced in July that Saudi Arabia had agreed to meet the costs of the Summit, estimated at $2.5 million. The offer was made during an official visit to the country by Diouf.

== Linked events ==
The outcomes of three related events taking place just ahead of the Summit contributed to the debate—a private-sector forum (Milan, 12–13 November), an inter-parliamentary meeting (Rome, 13 November) and a civil society forum (Rome, 14–16 November).

FAO says three events in October 2009 prepared the ground for the Summit. These were: a High-level Expert Forum on How to Feed to World in 2050, from 12–13 October; the Committee on World Food Security, from 14 to 17 October; and World Food Day on 16 October.

The launch of the 1 billion hungry campaign a week prior to the event.

FAO Director-General Jacques Diouf told a pre-Summit Private Sector Forum on 12 November that the importance of the private sector has increased due to privatization, globalization and the transformation of the food chain.

On the eve of the summit, FAO Director-General began a 24-hour hunger strike to call for action to end the scourge of hunger and in solidarity with the one billion humans who suffer chronic malnutrition. He called on "people of goodwill everywhere" to join him in a worldwide hunger strike this weekend.

FAO on Monday 16 November 2009, said that agreeing a climate change deal in Copenhagen at the COP15 ( 7–18 December 2009) is crucial to fighting global hunger, which Brazil's president described as "the most devastating weapon of mass destruction."

== Summit Related Documents ==
- Feeding the world in 2050
- Food security and the financial crisis
- Foreign Direct Investment – win-win or land grab?
- New challenges – climate change and bioenergy
- Non-distorting farm support
- Sub-Saharan Africa – realizing the potential
- The contribution of technology
- The investment imperative
- Transboundary Animal and Plant Pests and Diseases
- Global governance of food security
