= 2008 global rice crisis =

Crisis

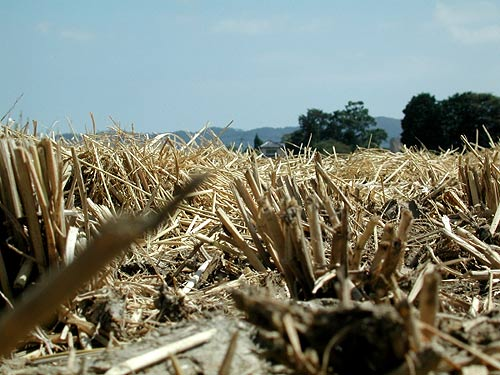
Rice field after harvest (in Japan).

The 2008 global rice crisis occurred between January and May 2008, the international trading of rice jumped dramatically, increasing more than 300% (from US$300 to US$1,200 per ton) in just four months. By December 2008, prices had decreased substantially, if not returned to previous levels, marking an end to the crisis.

== Causes ==
While the rice crisis did occur at the same time as the 2007–2008 world food price crisis, Tom Slayton has argued the spike in rice prices are a special case. Slayton argues that the price increases were a result of rising oil and petrochemical prices (peaking in July 2008); and export restrictions by a number of countries. Trying to protect citizens from inflating rice prices due to growing oil costs, some national governments, namely India and Vietnam, began restricting export of rice. Partly because of increasing wheat prices, the Indian government decided to increase the percentage of rice (over wheat) in its food distribution programs. To help secure food security, India (the source of more than 10% of world rice trade) stopped all non-Basmati exports in October 2007, lifting the ban temporarily, then re-applying it in April 2008. and some retailers began rationing sales, due to fears of insufficient global supplies of the grain. Vietnam, fearing shortages due to a cold wave on the Red River Delta in mid-January 2008, banned sales to international rice traders. Both of these cases caused a steady increase in prices during the first months of 2008. Other countries, including Egypt and Pakistan, as well as Brazil followed by placing their own restrictions on rice exports, helping to drive up the price even further.

As the market prices rose, Thailand developed an idea for a new organization to regulate rice supplies and prices. This new organization would've mirrored the system used in oil sales by the Organization for Petroleum Exporting Countries. The proposal for the Organization of Rice Exporting Countries never flourished, but the idea scared markets, allowing rice prices to reach very high levels.

In late April 2008, rice prices hit 24 cents a pound, twice the price that it was seven months earlier.

Six years of drought in Australia's rice-growing regions may also have encouraged people to fear a reduction in global rice supplies, and helped cause the commensurate rise in global prices.

== Effects ==
While Japan, which produces enough rice for its domestic needs, maintained a constant pricing and no consumer concern, Countries in West Africa as well as the Philippines, dependent upon imports to provide the staple food of rice, were particularly hard hit by increasing prices. Growing panic over retail prices in the Philippines spread across Asia. "People panicked everywhere," according to economist Peter Timmer. "In Ho Chi Minh City, for heaven's sake, the center of the second-largest rice exporting surplus in the world, supermarkets and rice markets got cleaned out in two days."

On 15 April, the Philippines, the world's largest rice importer, urged China, Japan, and other key Asian nations, to convene an emergency meeting, especially taking issue with those countries' rice export bans. "Free trade should be flowing", Philippine Agriculture Secretary Arthur Yap stated. In late April 2008, the Philippines government requested that the World Bank exert pressure on rice exporting countries to end export restrictions.

Asian rice consumers and merchants of agricultural products around the world had been aware of the problem for months, but it garnered widespread attention in the United States in the week beginning April 21, 2008 when a Costco Wholesale Corporation store in San Francisco, California limited rice purchases to five 20-pound bags per customer. Later in the week, on April 23, the outlet reduced that number to two. Also on April 23, Wal-Mart division Sam's Club announced it would limit the sales of 20-lb. bags of long-grain rice to four per customer. Other sources stated that the limits were only placed on imported rice, and that non-imported medium- and short-grain rice remained in comparative abundance.

Also on April 23, "Thai shipments of rice" to a major Canadian rice wholesaler, Western Mills, Ltd. abruptly ceased:

""We've never seen anything like this in the history of this company," said Lawry Poupart, controller at the company, which supplies major chains including Safeway and Save-On-Foods. "Everybody is precariously watching what's happening in the world."

=== Food Riots ===
Deadly riots over the rising price of food erupted in Haiti on April 4, 2008, due primarily to a jump in the price of rice, "the main ingredient of the Haitian diet,". Six people were killed in the unrest, including a U.N. peacekeeping soldier on April 12, and the unrest subsided only when the nation's Prime Minister resigned and the government lowered the price for a bushel of rice.

== Ending the crisis ==
While there was no physical shortage of rice, increasing prices created a panic that supplies could not match demand. This fear was lessened when the United States allowed Japan to export unsold American rice (stockpiled in Japan because of a World Trade Organization decision). As of 16 May, anticipation of the move had already lowered prices by 14% in a single week. Although the rice from Japan was never actually sold or shipped, the world market price continued to fall every month of 2008 thereafter.
