= Human food =

Substances consumed for human nutrition

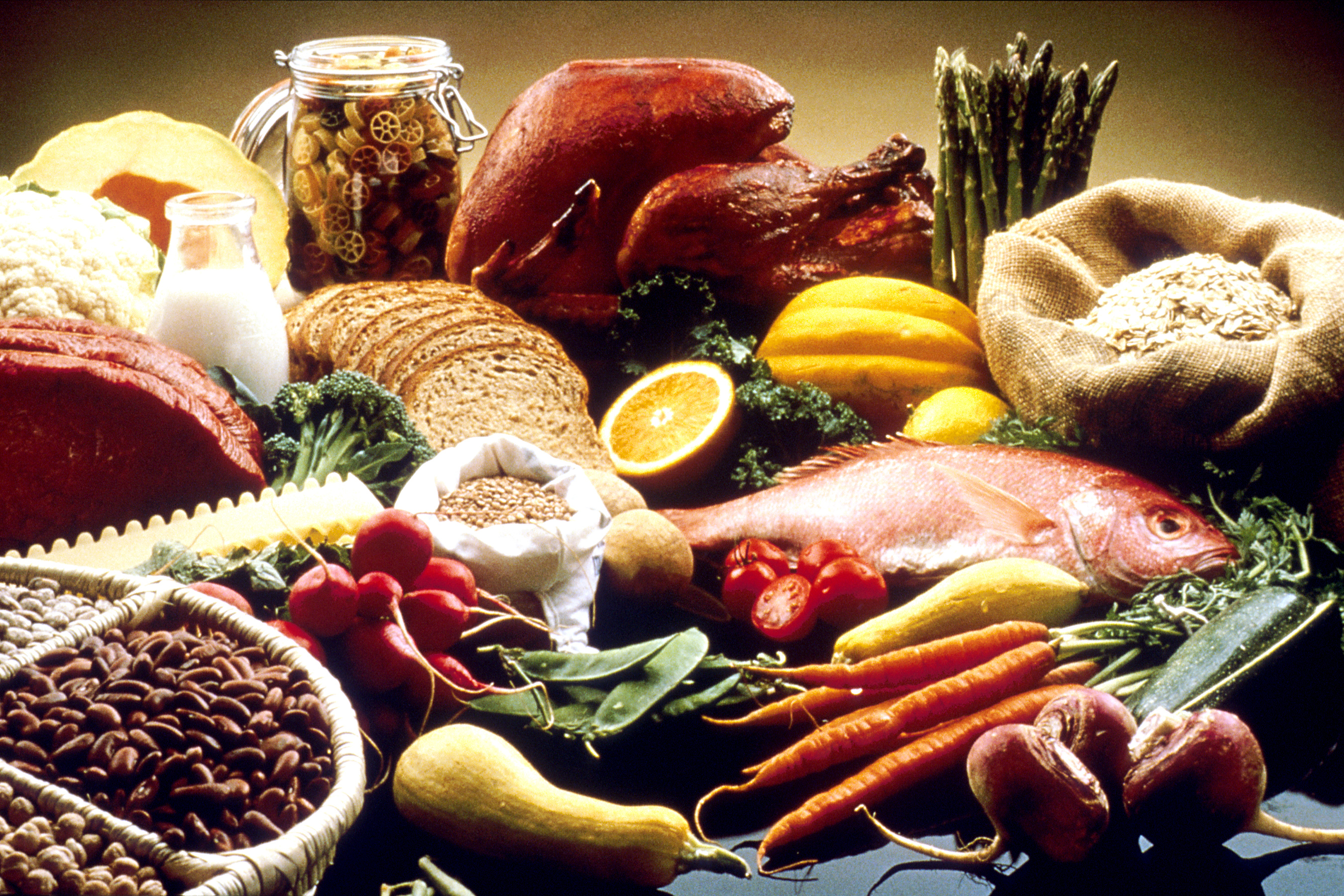
Display of various foods

Human food is food which is fit for human consumption, and which humans willingly eat. Food is a basic necessity of life, and humans typically seek food out as an instinctual response to hunger; however, not all things that are edible constitute as human food.

Humans eat various substances for energy, enjoyment and nutritional support. These are usually of plant, animal, or fungal origin, and contain essential nutrients, such as carbohydrates, fats, proteins, vitamins, and minerals. Humans are highly adaptable omnivores, and have adapted to obtain food in many different ecosystems. Historically, humans secured food through two main methods: hunting and gathering and agriculture. As agricultural technologies improved, humans settled into agriculture lifestyles with diets shaped by the agriculture opportunities in their region of the world. Geographic and cultural differences have led to the creation of numerous cuisines and culinary arts, including a wide array of ingredients, herbs, spices, techniques, and dishes. As cultures have mixed through forces like international trade and globalization, ingredients have become more widely available beyond their geographic and cultural origins, creating a cosmopolitan exchange of different food traditions and practices.

Today, the majority of the food energy required by the ever-increasing population of the world is supplied by the industrial food industry, which produces food with intensive agriculture and distributes it through complex food processing and food distribution systems. This system of conventional agriculture relies heavily on fossil fuels, which means that the food and agricultural system is one of the major contributors to climate change, accountable for as much as 37% of the total greenhouse gas emissions. Addressing the carbon intensity of the food system and food waste are important mitigation measures in the global response to climate change.

The food system has significant impacts on a wide range of other social and political issues, including: sustainability, biological diversity, economics, population growth, water supply, and access to food. The right to food is a "human right" derived from the International Covenant on Economic, Social and Cultural Rights (ICESCR), recognizing the "right to an adequate standard of living, including adequate food", as well as the "fundamental right to be free from hunger". Because of these fundamental rights, food security is often a priority international policy activity; for example Sustainable Development Goal 2 "Zero hunger" is meant to eliminate hunger by 2030. Food safety and food security are monitored by international agencies like the International Association for Food Protection, World Resources Institute, World Food Programme, Food and Agriculture Organization, and International Food Information Council, and are often subject to national regulation by institutions, such as the Food and Drug Administration in the United States.

== Food sources ==
Humans are omnivores finding sustenance in vegetables, fruits, cooked meat, milk, eggs, mushrooms and seaweed. Cereal grain is a staple food that provides more food energy worldwide than any other type of crop. Corn (maize), wheat, and rice account for 87% of all grain production worldwide. Just over half of the world's crops are used to feed humans (55 percent), with 36 percent grown as animal feed and 9 percent as energy crop for biofuels. Fungi and bacteria are also used in the preparation of fermented foods like bread, wine, cheese and yogurt.

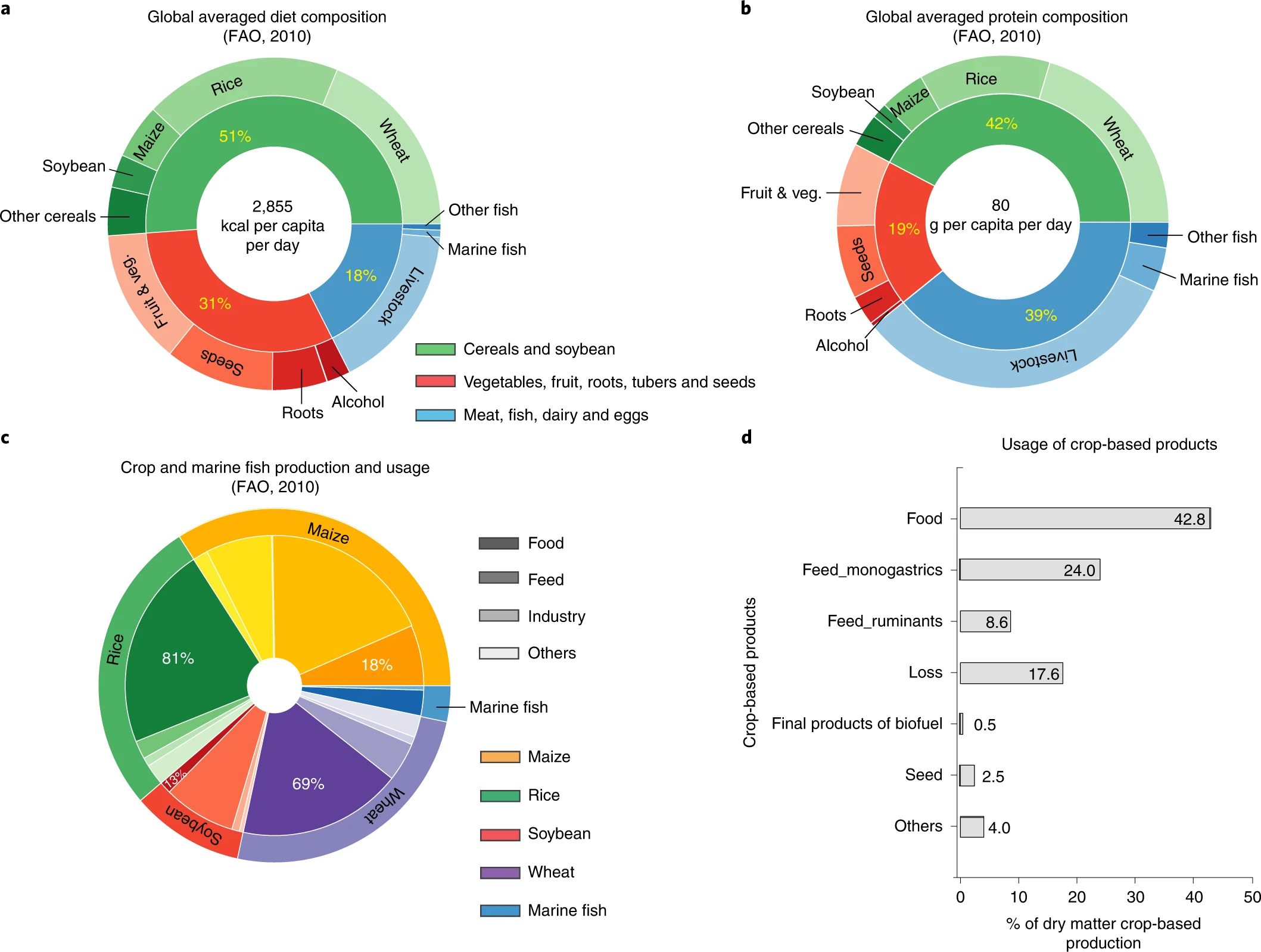
Global average human diet and protein composition and usage of crop-based products (more statistics)

Humans eat thousands of plant species; there may be as many as 75,000 edible species of angiosperms (flowering plants), of which perhaps 7,000 are often eaten. Most human plant-based food calories come from maize, rice, and wheat. Plants can be processed into bread, pasta, cereals, juices and jams, or raw ingredients such as sugar, herbs, spices and oils can be extracted. Oilseeds are often pressed to produce rich oils: sunflower, flaxseed, rapeseed (including canola oil) and sesame.

Animals may be used as food either directly or indirectly. This includes meat, eggs, shellfish and dairy products like milk and cheese. They are an important source of protein and are considered complete proteins for human consumption, as (unlike most plant proteins) they contain all the amino acids essential for the human body. Some cultures and people do not consume meat or animal food products for cultural, dietary, health, ethical, or ideological reasons. Vegetarians choose to forgo food from animal sources to varying degrees. Vegans do not consume any foods that contain ingredients from an animal source.

Fish and other marine animals are harvested from lakes, rivers, wetlands, inland waters, coasts, estuaries, mangroves, near-shore areas, and marine and ocean waters. Although aquatic foods contribute significantly to the health of billions of people around the world, they tend to be undervalued nutritionally, primarily because their diversity is framed in a monolithic way as "seafood or fish." Worldwide, aquatic foods are available every season and are produced in a wide variety. Over 2,370 species are harvested from wild fisheries, and about 624 are farmed in aquaculture. Fish powder for infants, fish wafers for snacks, and fish chutneys have all been developed because marine foods are nutrient-dense.

== Taste perception ==
Some animals, specifically humans, have five different types of tastes: sweet, sour, salty, bitter, and umami. As such animals have evolved, the tastes that provide the most energy (sugar and fats) are the most pleasant to eat while others, such as bitter, are not enjoyable. Water, while important for survival, has no taste. Fats, on the other hand, especially saturated fats, are thicker and rich and are thus considered more enjoyable to eat.

=== Sweet ===
Structure of sucrose

Generally regarded as the most pleasant taste, sweetness is almost always provided by a type of simple sugar such as glucose or fructose, or disaccharides such as sucrose, a molecule combining glucose and fructose. Complex carbohydrates are long chains and do not have a sweet taste.

In the natural settings that human primate ancestors evolved in, sweetness intensity should indicate energy density, while bitterness tends to indicate toxicity. The high sweetness detection threshold and low bitterness detection threshold would have predisposed our primate ancestors to seek out sweet-tasting (and energy-dense) foods and avoid bitter-tasting foods.

Artificial sweeteners such as sucralose are used to mimic the sugar molecule, creating the sensation of sweetness, without the energy. The stevia plant contains a compound known as steviol which, when extracted, has 300 times the sweetness of sugar while having minimal impact on blood sugar.

=== Sour ===
Sourness is caused by the taste of acids, such as vinegar in alcoholic beverages. Sour foods include citrus, specifically lemons, limes, and to a lesser degree oranges. Sour is evolutionarily significant as it is a sign of food that may have gone rancid due to bacteria. Many foods, however, are slightly acidic and help stimulate the taste buds and enhance flavour.

=== Salty ===
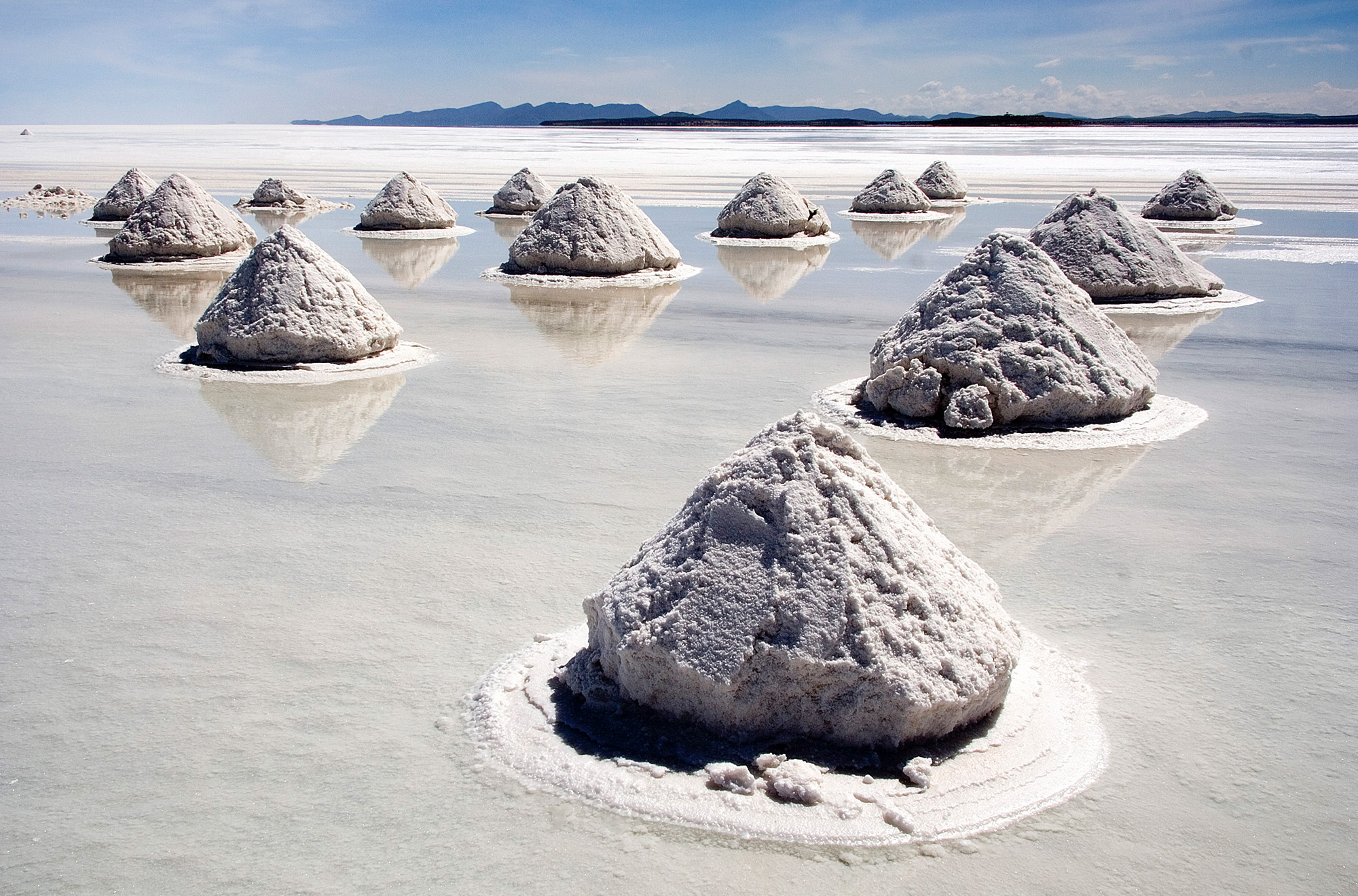
Salt mounds in Bolivia

Saltiness is the taste of alkali metal ions such as sodium and potassium. It is found in almost every food in low to moderate proportions to enhance flavour, although eating pure salt is regarded as highly unpleasant. There are many different types of salt, with each having a different degree of saltiness, including sea salt, fleur de sel, kosher salt, mined salt, and grey salt.

Other than enhancing flavour, salty foods are significant for body needs and maintaining a delicate electrolyte balance, which is the kidney's function. Salt may be iodized, meaning iodine has been added to it. Iodine is a necessary nutrient for maintenance of thyroid function, and the addition of iodine to salt became a public-health practice in the mid 20th century to prevent iodine deficiency and related diseases such as endemic goitre.

Some canned foods, notably soups or packaged broths, tend to be high in salt as a means of preserving the food longer. Historically salt has long been used as a meat preservative as salt promotes water excretion. Similarly, dried foods also promote food safety.

=== Bitter ===
Bitterness is a sensation often considered unpleasant and characterized by having a sharp, pungent taste. Unsweetened dark chocolate, caffeine, lemon rind, and some types of fruit are known to be bitter.

=== Umami ===
Umami has been described as savoury and is characteristic of broths and cooked meats. Foods that have a strong umami flavor include meats, shellfish, fish (including fish sauce and preserved fish such as Maldives fish, sardines, and anchovies), tomatoes, mushrooms, hydrolyzed vegetable protein, meat extract, yeast extract, cheeses, and soy sauce.

== Cuisine ==
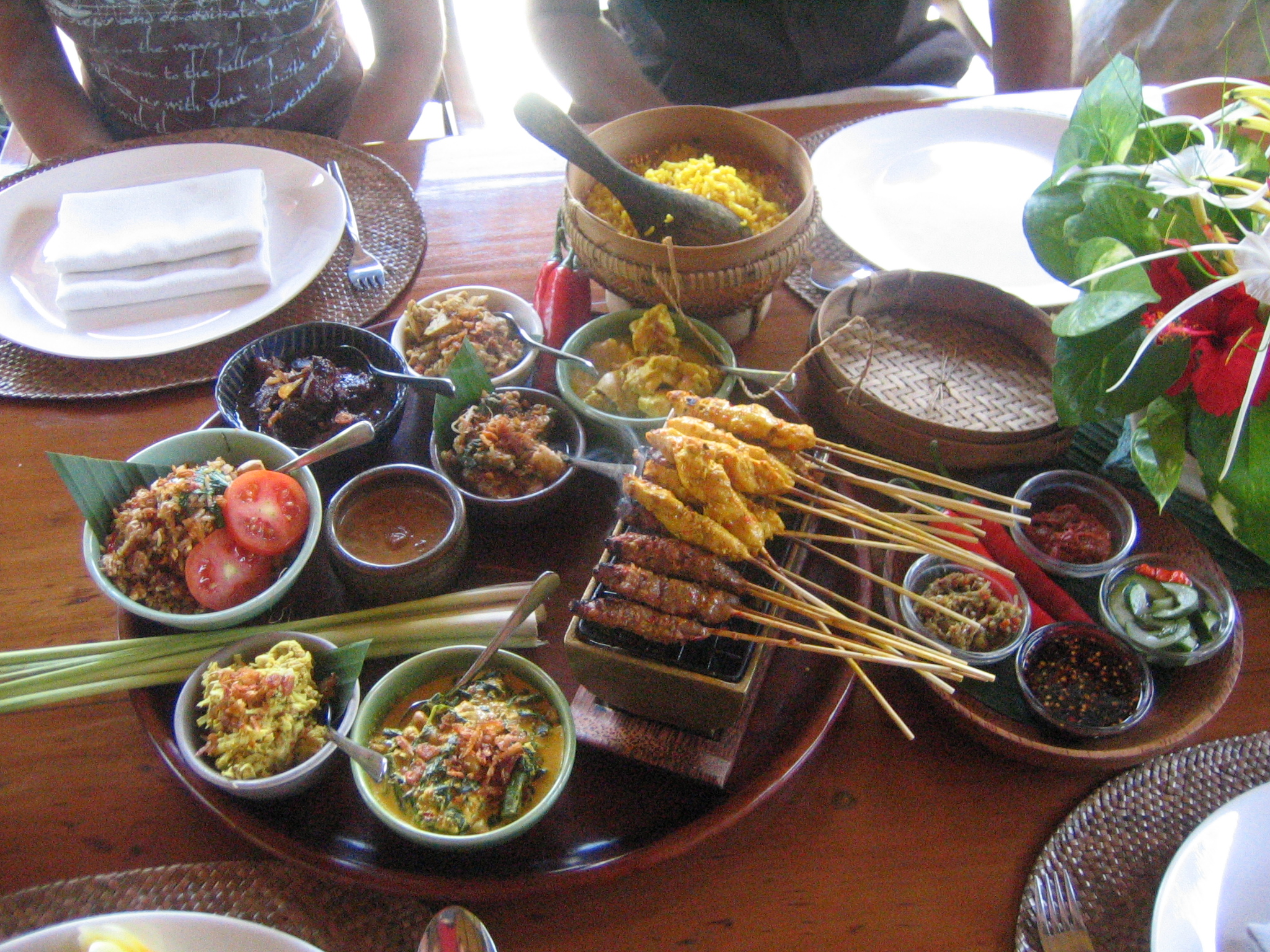
Typical Balinese cuisine in Indonesia

Many scholars claim that the rhetorical function of food is to represent the culture of a country and that it can be used as a form of communication. According to Goode, Curtis and Theophano, food "is the last aspect of an ethnic culture to be lost".

Many cultures have a recognizable cuisine, a specific set of cooking traditions using various spices or a combination of flavours unique to that culture, which evolves. Other differences include preferences (hot or cold, spicy, etc.) and practices, the study of which is known as gastronomy. Many cultures have diversified their foods by utilizing preparation, cooking methods, and manufacturing. This also includes a complex food trade which helps the cultures to economically survive by way of food, not just by consumption.

Some popular types of ethnic foods include Italian, French, Japanese, Chinese, American, Cajun, Thai, African, Indian and Nepalese. Various cultures throughout the world study the dietary analysis of food habits. While evolutionarily speaking, as opposed to culturally, humans are omnivores, religion and social constructs such as morality, activism, or environmentalism will often affect which foods they will consume. Food is eaten and typically enjoyed through the sense of taste, the perception of flavour from eating and drinking. Certain tastes are more enjoyable than others, for evolutionary purposes.

=== Presentation ===
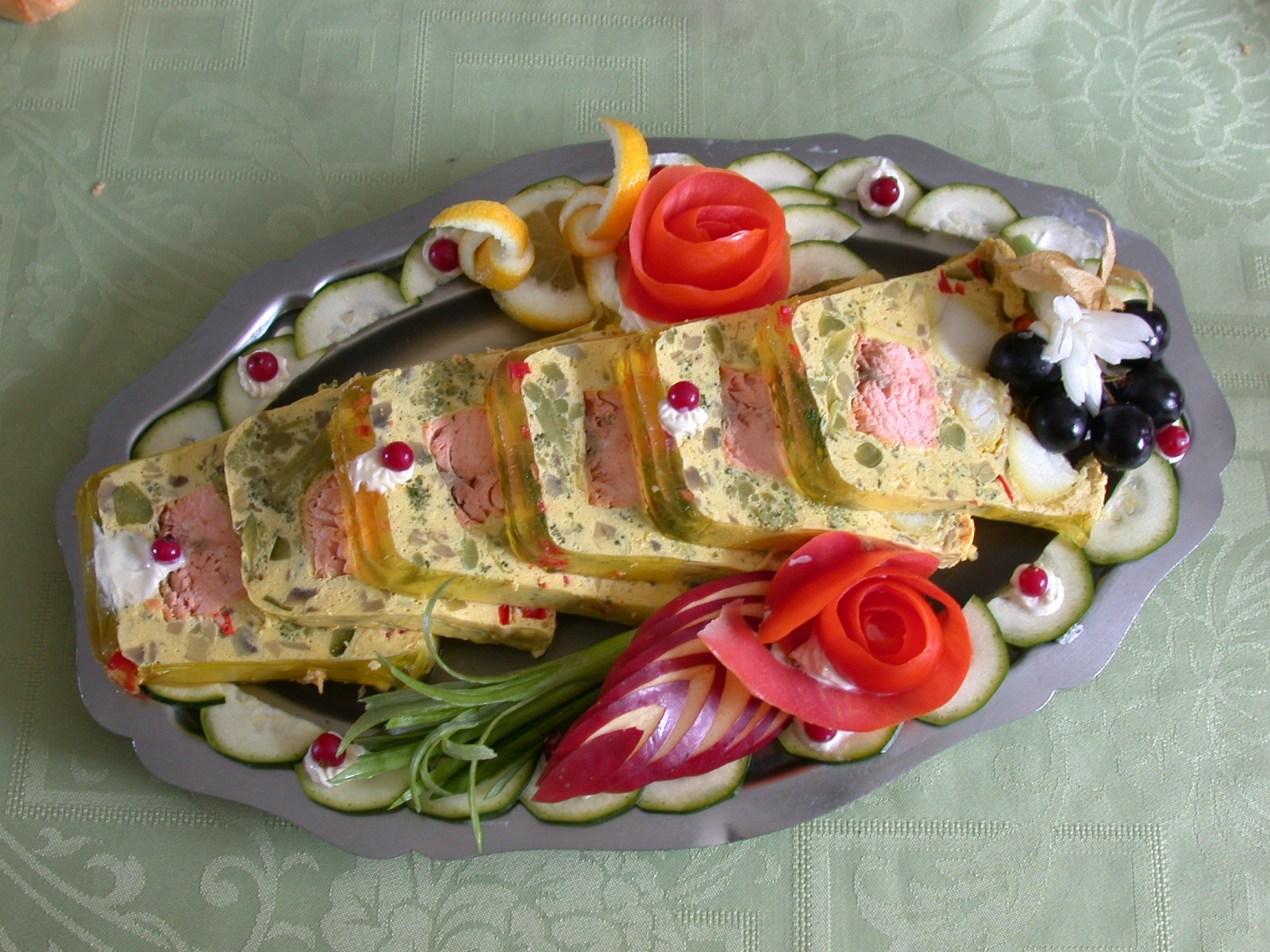
A French basil salmon terrine, with eye-appealing garnishes

Aesthetically pleasing and eye-appealing food presentations can encourage people to consume food. A common saying is that people "eat with their eyes". Food presented in a clean and appetizing way will encourage a good flavour, even if unsatisfactory.

Texture plays a crucial role in the enjoyment of eating foods. Contrasts in textures, such as something crunchy in an otherwise smooth dish, may increase the appeal of eating it. Common examples include adding granola to yoghurt, adding croutons to a salad or soup, and toasting bread to enhance its crunchiness for a smooth topping, such as jam or butter.

Another universal phenomenon regarding food is the appeal of contrast in taste and presentation. For example, such opposite flavours as sweetness and saltiness tend to go well together, as in kettle corn and nuts.

=== Food preparation ===
While many foods can be eaten raw, many also undergo some form of preparation for reasons of safety, palatability, texture, or flavour. At the simplest level, this may involve washing, cutting, trimming, or adding other foods or ingredients, such as spices. It may also involve mixing, heating or cooling, pressure cooking, fermentation, or combination with other food. In a home, most food preparation takes place in a kitchen. Some preparation is done to enhance the taste or aesthetic appeal; other preparation may help to preserve the food; others may be involved in cultural identity. A meal is made up of food which is prepared to be eaten at a specific time and place.

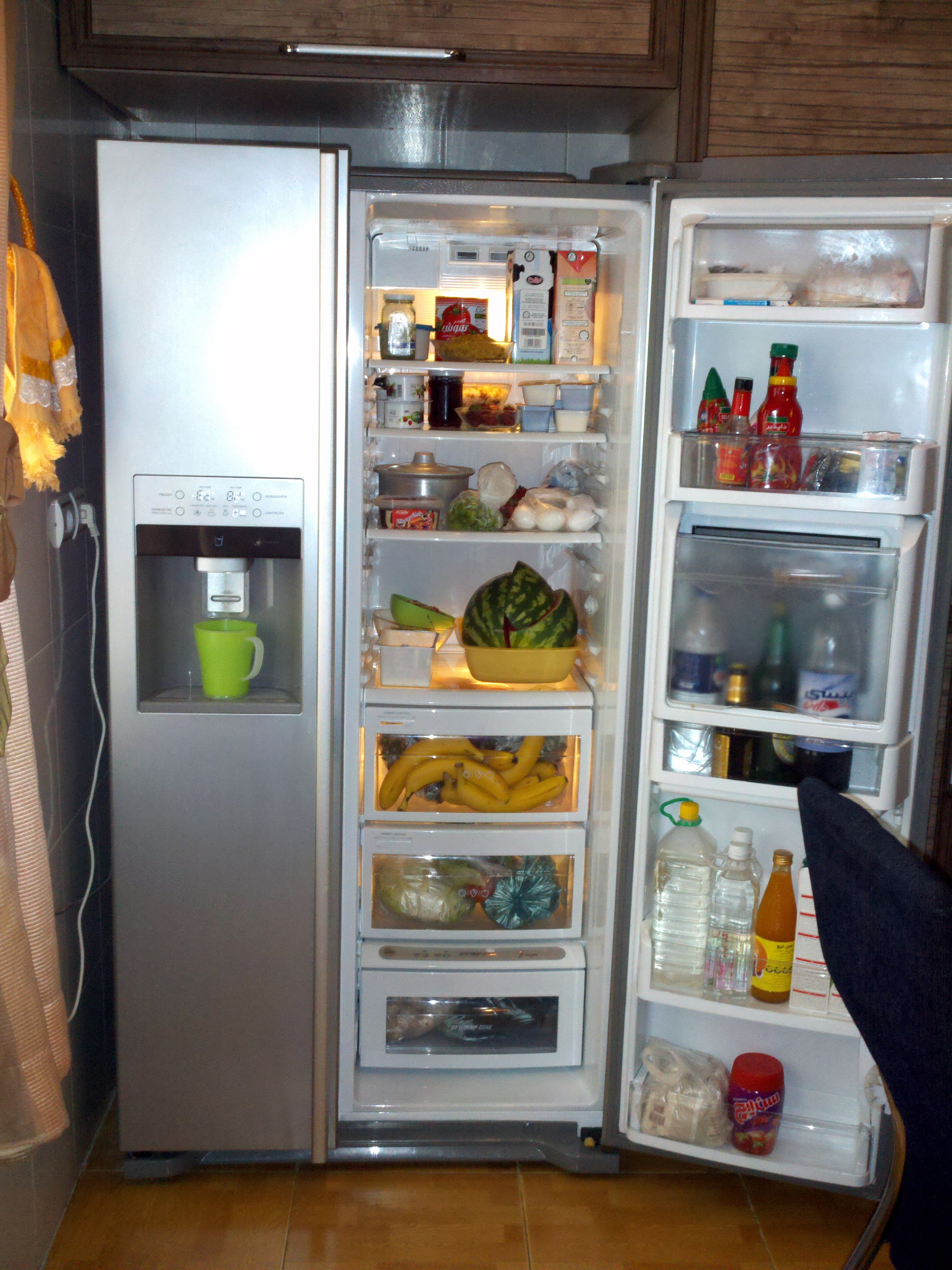
A refrigerator helps to keep foods fresh.

==== Animal preparation ====
The preparation of animal-based food usually involves slaughter, evisceration, hanging, portioning, and rendering. In developed countries, this is usually done outside the home in slaughterhouses, which are used to process animals en masse for meat production. Many countries regulate their slaughterhouses by law. For example, the United States established the Humane Slaughter Act of 1958, which requires that an animal be stunned before killing. This act, like those in many countries, exempts slaughter following religious law, such as kosher, shechita, and dhabīḥah halal. Strict interpretations of kashrut require the animal to be fully aware when its carotid artery is cut.

On the local level, a butcher may commonly break down larger animal meat into smaller manageable cuts, and pre-wrap them for commercial sale or wrap them to order in butcher paper. In addition, fish and seafood may be fabricated into smaller cuts by a fishmonger. However, fish butchery may be done on board a fishing vessel and quick-frozen for the preservation of the quality.

==== Raw food preparation ====
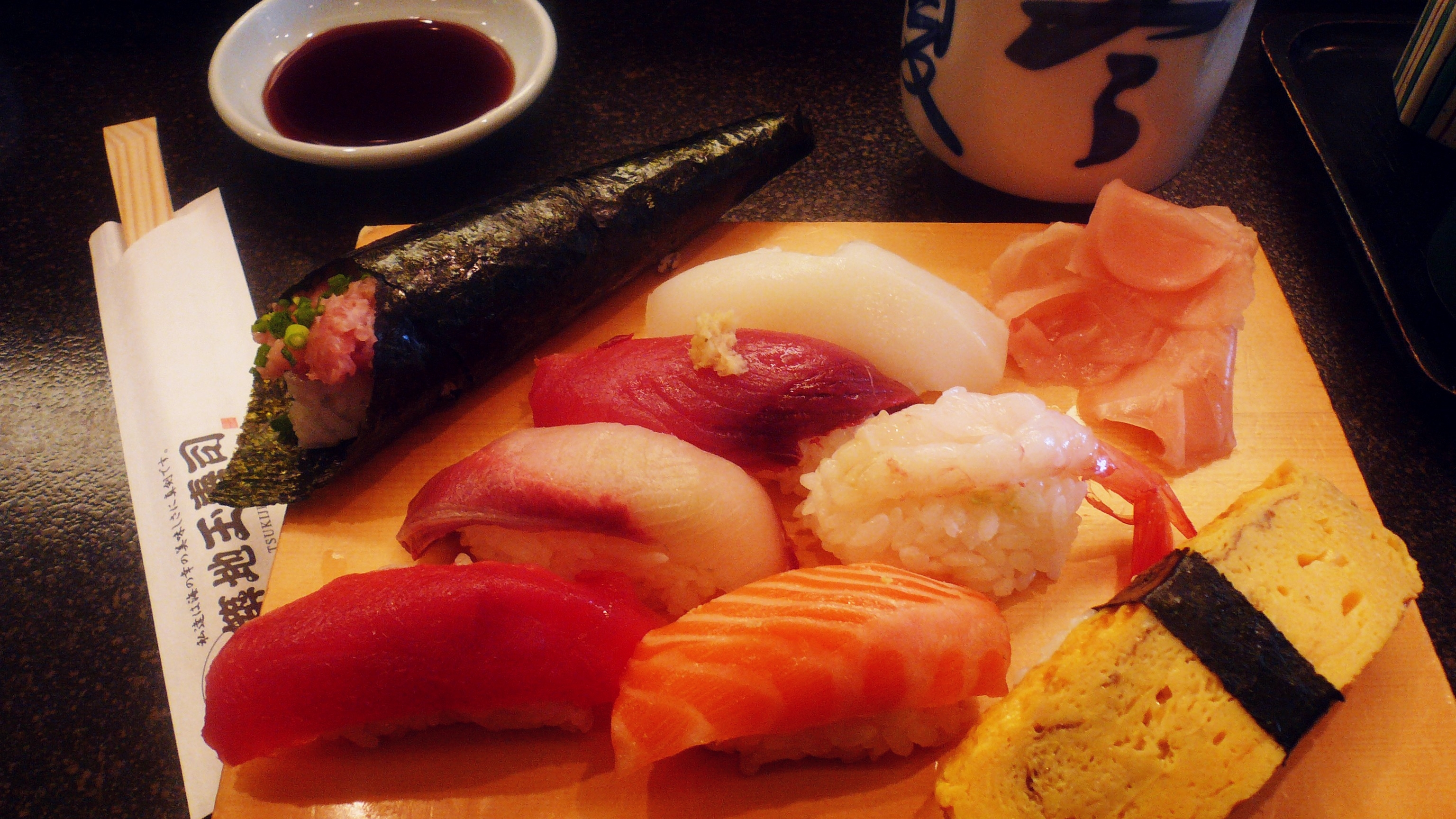
Many types of fish ready to be eaten, including salmon and tuna

Certain cultures highlight animal and vegetable foods in a raw state. Salads consisting of raw vegetables or fruits are common in many cuisines. Sashimi in Japanese cuisine consists of raw sliced fish or other meat, and sushi often incorporates raw fish or seafood. Steak tartare and salmon tartare are dishes made from diced or ground raw beef or salmon, mixed with various ingredients and served with baguettes, brioche, or frites. In Italy, carpaccio is a dish of very thinly sliced raw beef, drizzled with a vinaigrette made with olive oil. The health food movement known as raw foodism promotes a mostly vegan diet of raw fruits, vegetables, and grains prepared in various ways, including juicing, food dehydration, sprouting, and other methods of preparation that do not heat the food above 118 °F (47.8 °C). An example of a raw meat dish is ceviche, a Latin American dish made with raw meat that is "cooked" from the highly acidic citric juice from lemons and limes along with other aromatics such as garlic.

==== Cooking ====
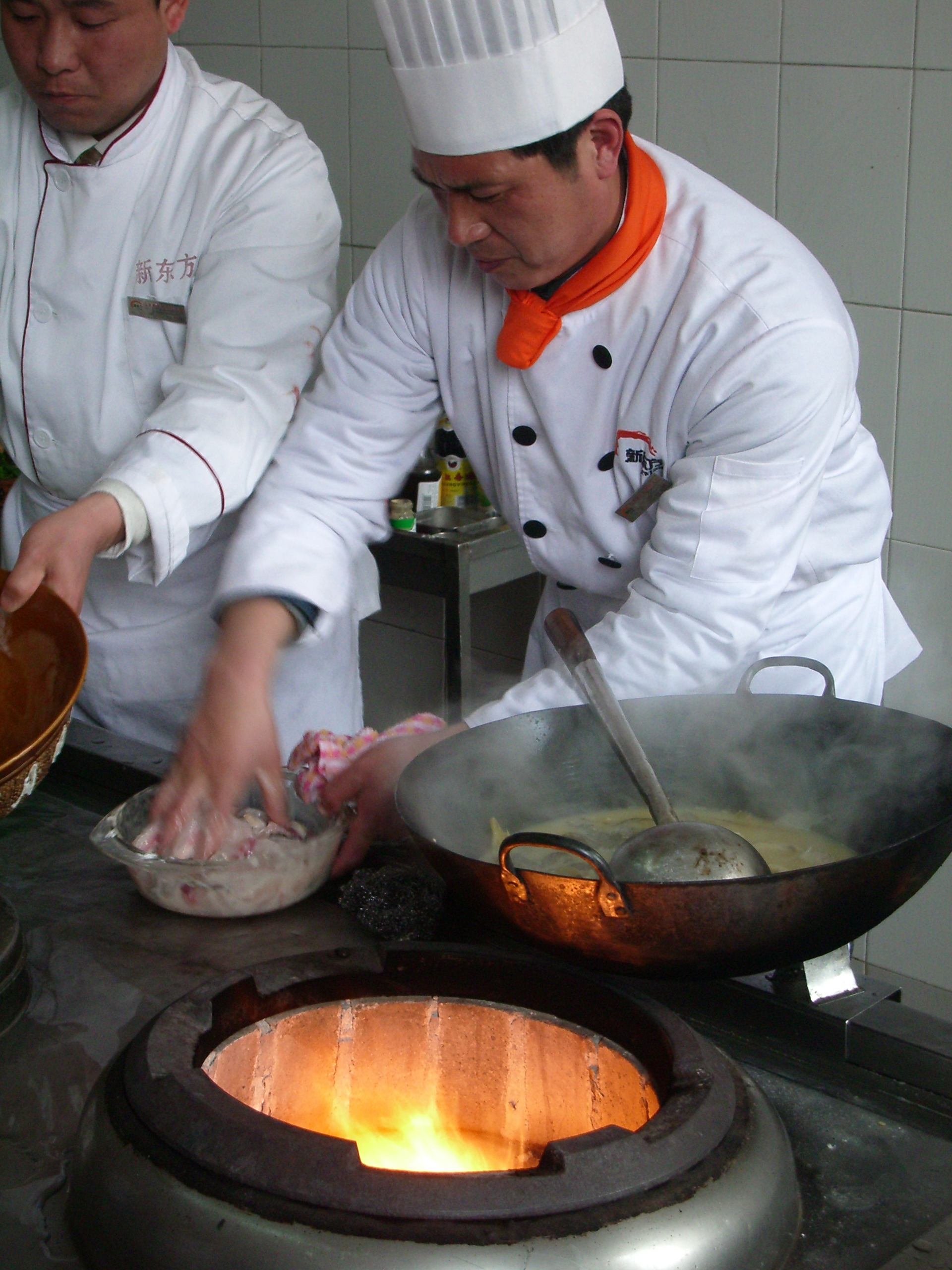
Cooking with a wok in China

The term "cooking" encompasses a vast range of methods, tools, and combinations of ingredients to improve the flavour or digestibility of food. Cooking technique, known as culinary art, generally requires the selection, measurement, and combining of ingredients in an ordered procedure to achieve the desired result. Constraints on success include the variability of ingredients, ambient conditions, tools, and the skill of the individual cook. The diversity of cooking worldwide is a reflection of the myriad nutritional, aesthetic, agricultural, economic, cultural, and religious considerations that affect it.

Cooking requires applying heat to a food which usually, though not always, chemically changes the molecules, thus changing its flavour, texture, appearance, and nutritional properties. Cooking certain proteins, such as egg whites, meats, and fish, denatures the protein, causing it to become firm. There is archaeological evidence of roasted foodstuffs at Homo erectus campsites dating from 420,000 years ago. Boiling as a means of cooking requires a container, and has been practised at least since the 10th millennium BC with the introduction of pottery.

===== Cooking equipment =====
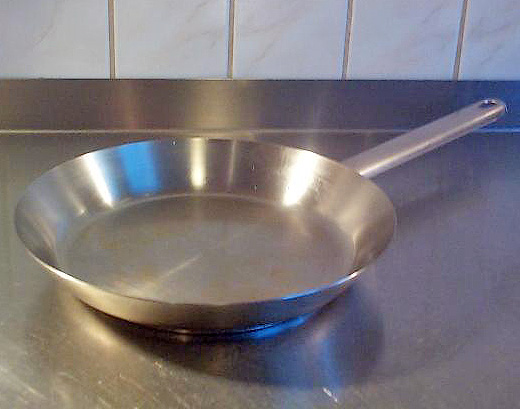
A stainless steel frying pan

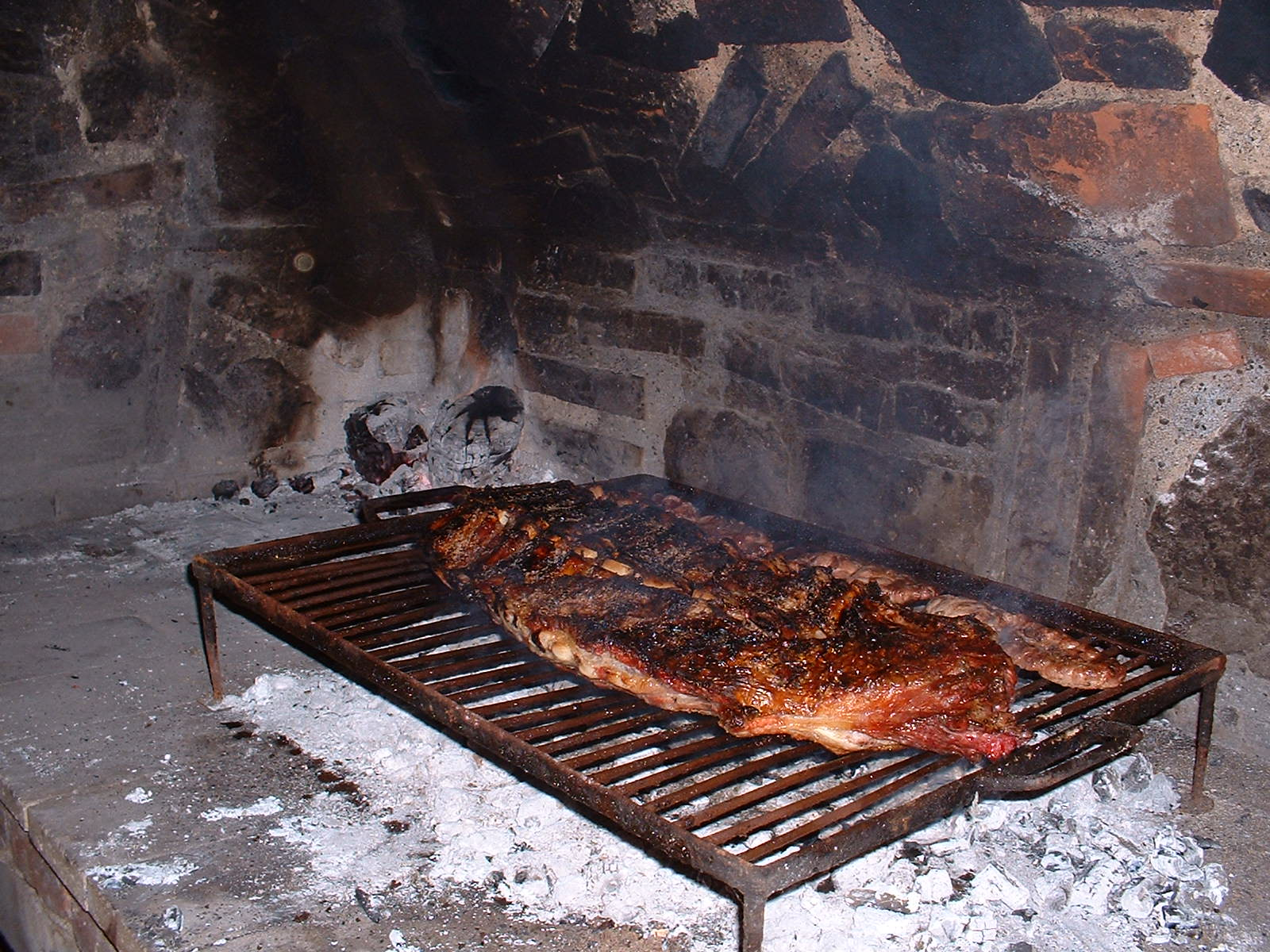
A traditional asado (barbecue)

There are many different types of equipment used for cooking.

Ovens are mostly hollow devices that get very hot, up to 500 °F (260 °C), and are used for baking or roasting and offer a dry-heat cooking method. Different cuisines will use different types of ovens. For example, Indian culture uses a tandoor oven, which is a cylindrical clay oven which operates at a single high temperature. Western kitchens use variable temperature convection ovens, conventional ovens, toaster ovens, or non-radiant heat ovens like the microwave oven. Classic Italian cuisine includes the use of a brick oven containing burning wood. Ovens may be wood-fired, coal-fired, gas, electric, or oil-fired.

Various types of cooktops are used as well. They carry the same variations of fuel types as the ovens mentioned above. Cook-tops are used to heat vessels placed on top of the heat source, such as a sauté pan, sauce pot, frying pan, or pressure cooker. These pieces of equipment can use either a moist or dry cooking method and include methods such as steaming, simmering, boiling, and poaching for moist methods, while the dry methods include sautéing, pan frying, and deep-frying.

In addition, many cultures use grills for cooking. A grill operates with a radiant heat source from below, usually covered with a metal grid and sometimes a cover. An open-pit barbecue in the American south is one example along with the American-style outdoor grill fueled by wood, liquid propane, or charcoal along with soaked wood chips for smoking. A Mexican style of barbecue is called barbacoa, which involves the cooking of meats such as whole sheep over an open fire. In Argentina, an asado (Spanish for "grilled") is prepared on a grill held over an open pit or fire made upon the ground, on which a whole animal or smaller cuts are grilled.

=== Restaurants ===
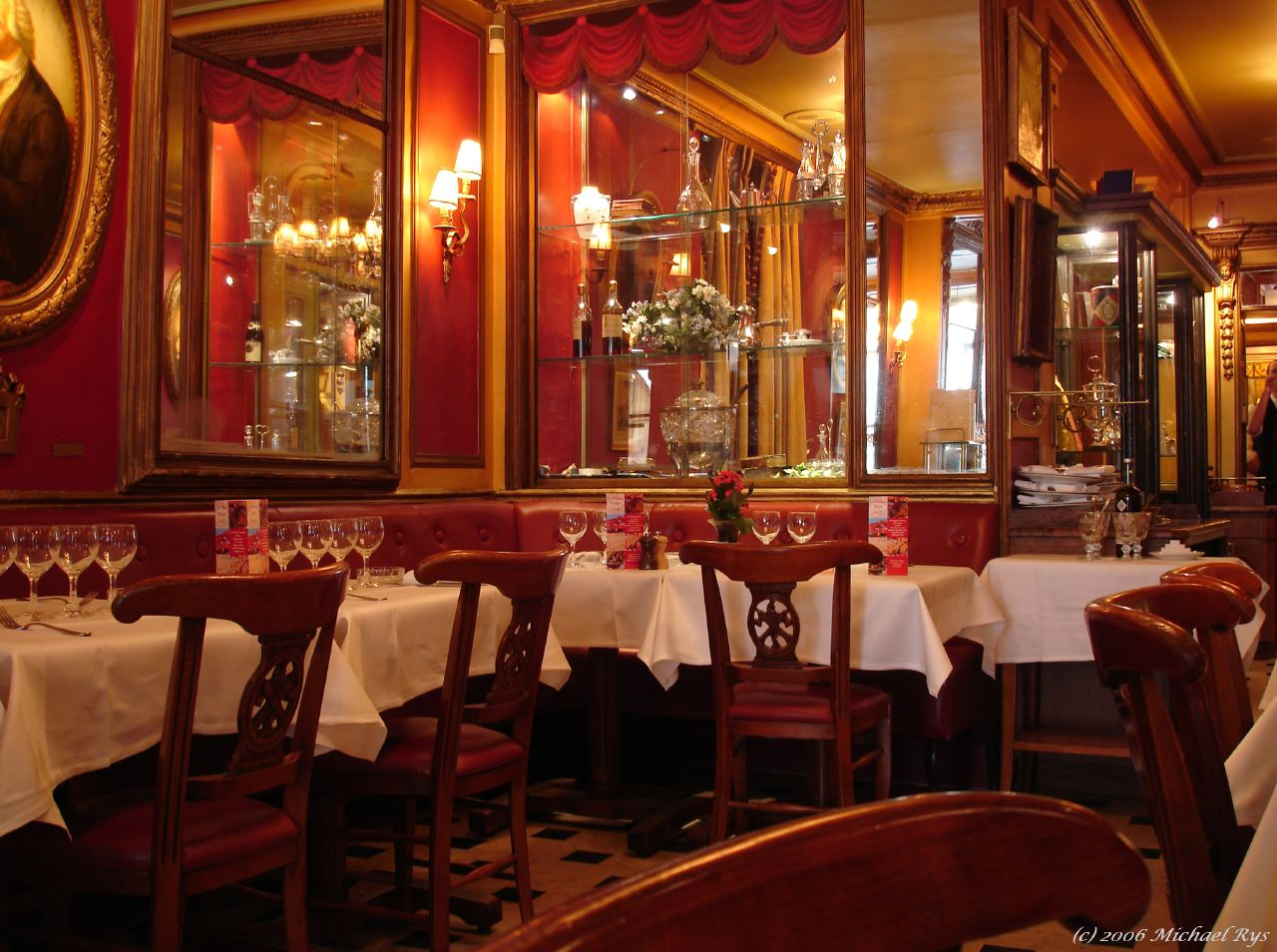
Café Procope in Paris was founded in 1686.

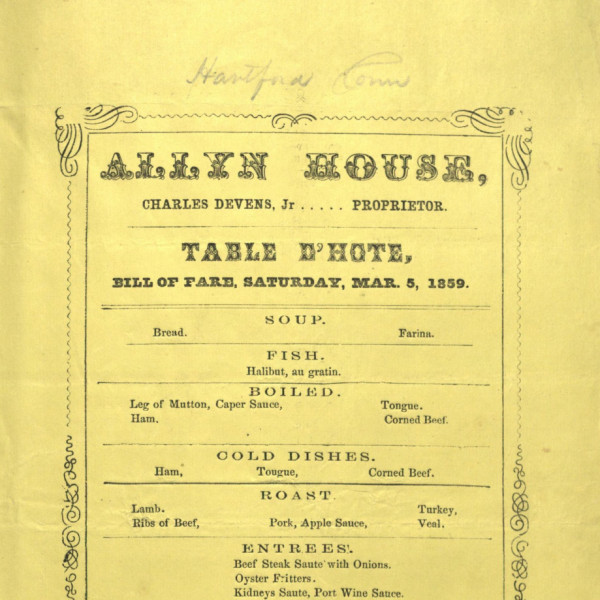
The Allyn House restaurant menu (5 March 1859)

Restaurants employ chefs to prepare the food, and waiters to serve customers at the table. The term restaurant comes from an old term for a restorative meat broth; this broth (or bouillon) was served in elegant outlets in Paris from the mid 18th century. These refined "restaurants" were a marked change from the usual basic eateries such as inns and taverns, and some had developed from early Parisian cafés, such as Café Procope, by first serving bouillon, then adding other cooked food to their menus.

Commercial eateries existed during the Roman period, with evidence of 150 "thermopolia", a form of fast food restaurant, found in Pompeii, and urban sales of prepared foods may have existed in China during the Song dynasty.

== Economy ==
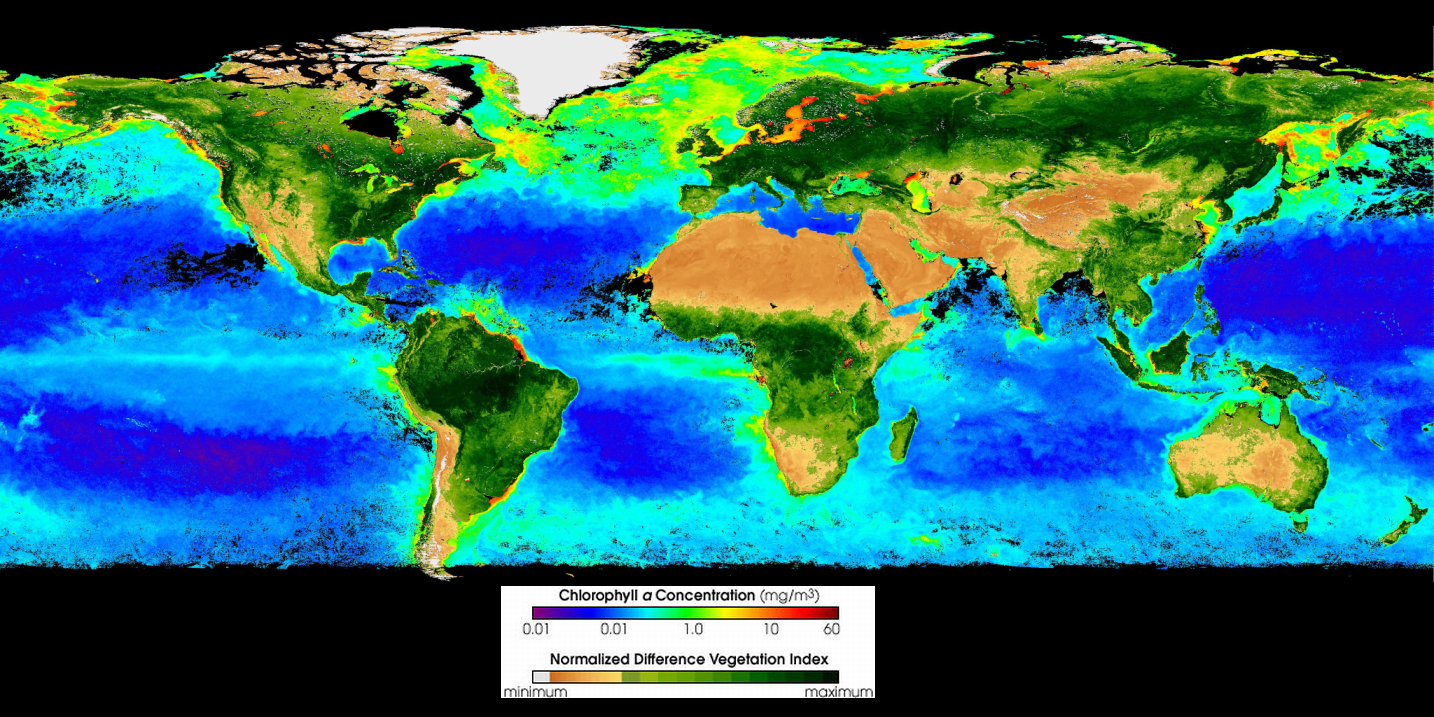
SeaWiFS image for the global biosphere

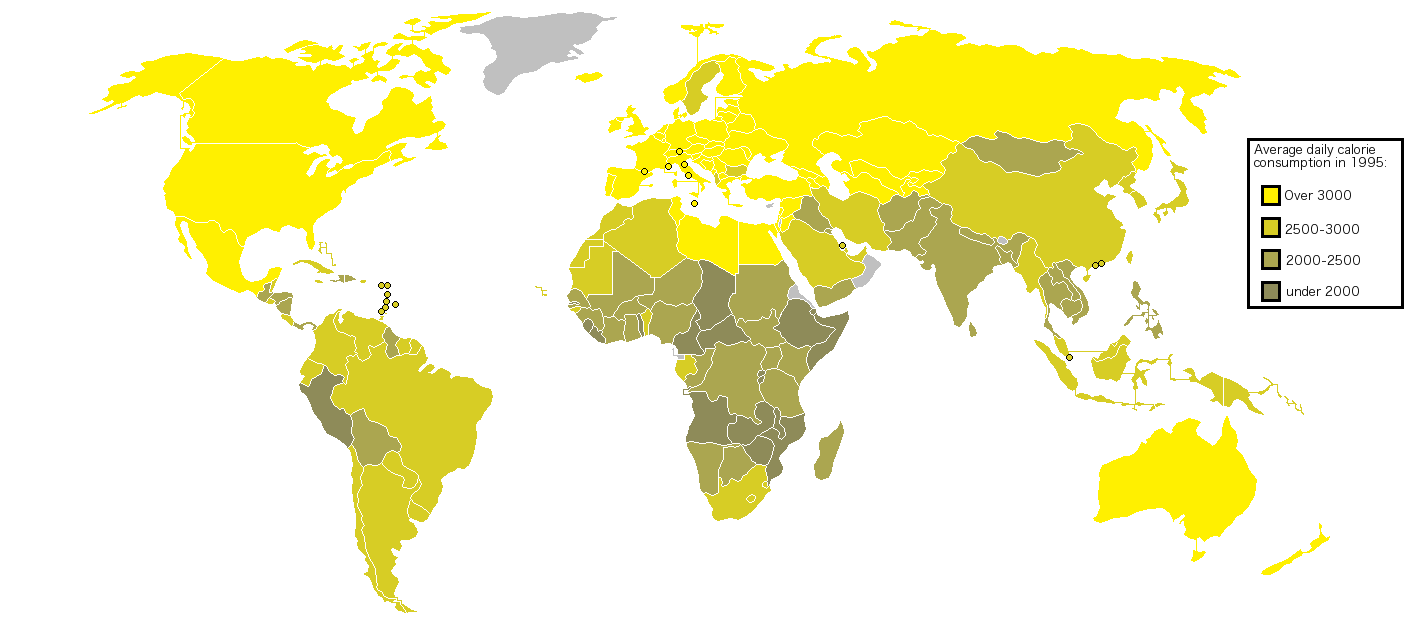
Global average daily calorie consumption in 1995

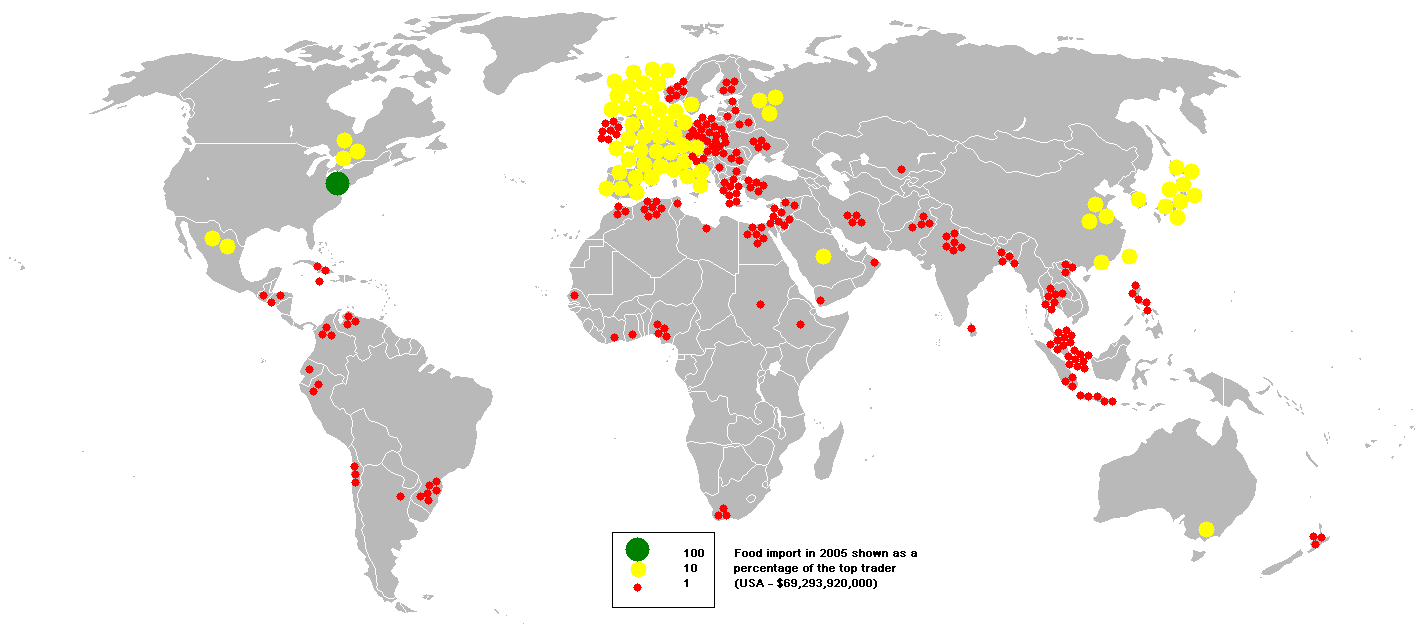
Food imports in 2005

Population density by country

Food systems have complex economic and social value chains that effect many parts of the global economy.

=== Production ===
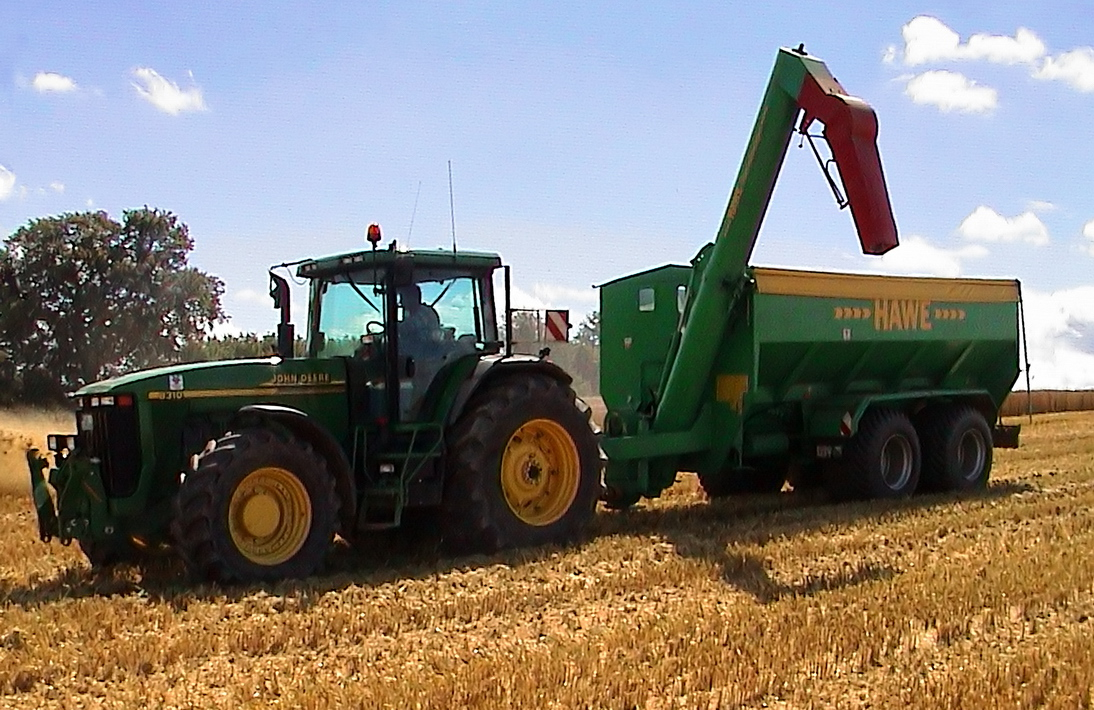
A tractor pulling a chaser bin

Most food has always been obtained through agriculture. With increasing concern over both the methods and products of modern industrial agriculture, there has been a growing trend toward sustainable agricultural practices. This approach, partly fueled by consumer demand, encourages biodiversity, local self-reliance and organic farming methods. Major influences on food production include international organizations (e.g. the World Trade Organization and Common Agricultural Policy), national government policy (or law), and war.

Several organisations have begun calling for a new kind of agriculture in which agroecosystems provide food but also support vital ecosystem services so that soil fertility and biodiversity are maintained rather than compromised. According to the International Water Management Institute and UNEP, well-managed agroecosystems not only provide food, fibre and animal products, they also provide services such as flood mitigation, groundwater recharge, erosion control and habitats for plants, birds, fish and other animals.

=== Food manufacturing ===
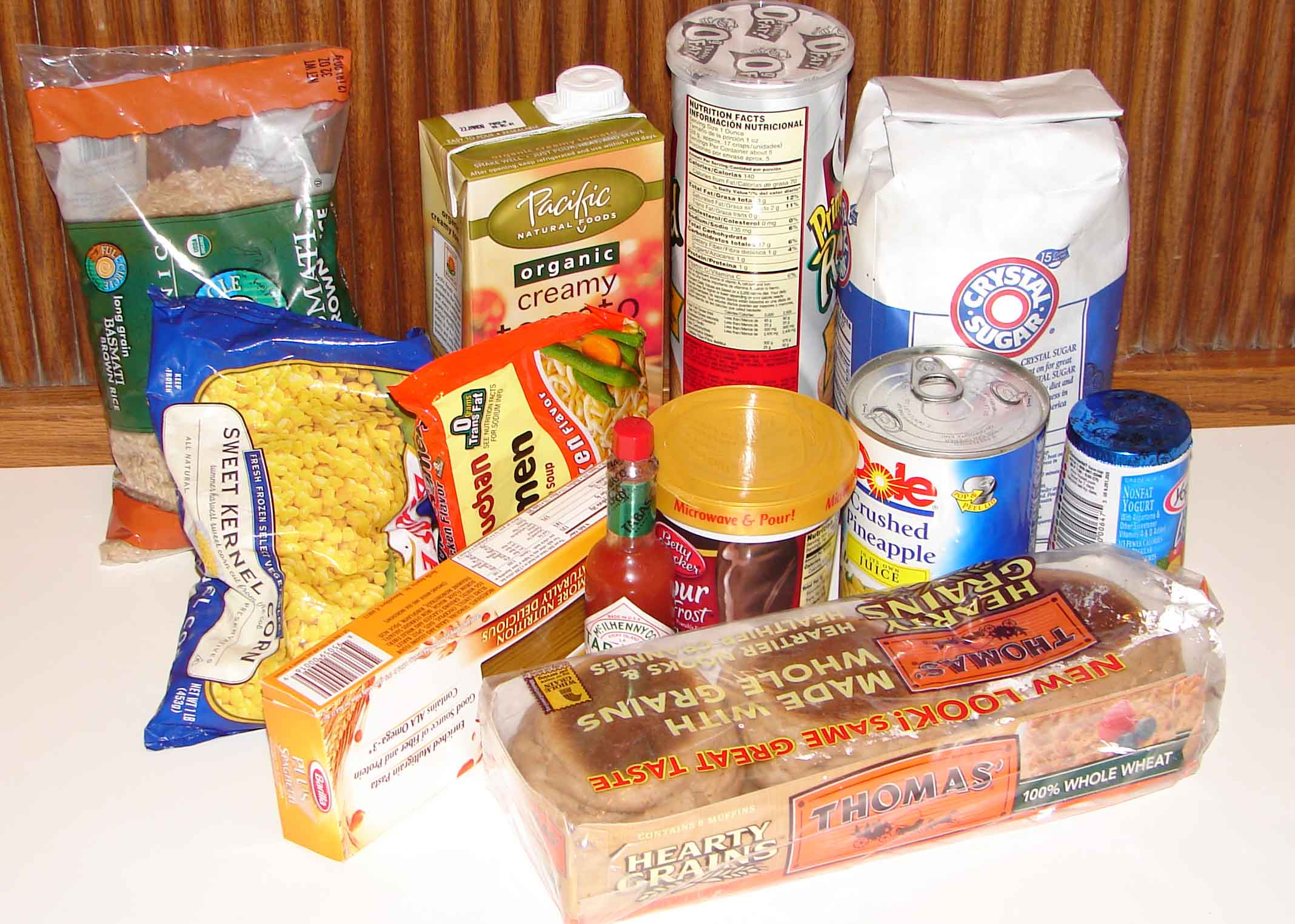
Packaged household food items

Packaged foods are manufactured outside the home for purchase. This can be as simple as a butcher preparing meat or as complex as a modern international food industry. Early food processing techniques were limited by available food preservation, packaging, and transportation. This mainly involved salting, curing, curdling, drying, pickling, fermenting, and smoking. Food manufacturing arose during the Industrial Revolution in the 19th century. This development took advantage of new mass markets and emerging technology, such as milling, preservation, packaging and labeling, and transportation. It brought the advantages of pre-prepared time-saving food to the bulk of ordinary people who did not employ domestic servants.

At the start of the 21st century, a two-tier structure has arisen, with a few international food processing giants controlling a wide range of well-known food brands. There also exists a wide array of small local or national food processing companies. Advanced technologies have also come to change food manufacturing. Computer-based control systems, sophisticated processing and packaging methods, and logistics and distribution advances can enhance product quality, improve food safety, and reduce costs.

=== International food imports and exports ===
The World Bank reported that the European Union was the top food importer in 2005, followed at a distance by the US and Japan. Britain's need for food was especially well-illustrated in World War II. Despite the implementation of food rationing, Britain remained dependent on food imports and the result was a long-term engagement in the Battle of the Atlantic.

Food is traded and marketed on a global basis. The variety and availability of food is no longer restricted by the diversity of locally grown food or the limitations of the local growing season. Between 1961 and 1999, there was a 400% increase in worldwide food exports. Some countries are now economically dependent on food exports, which in some cases account for over 80% of all exports.

In 1994, over 100 countries became signatories to the Uruguay Round of the General Agreement on Tariffs and Trade in a dramatic increase in trade liberalization. This included an agreement to reduce subsidies paid to farmers, underpinned by the WTO enforcement of agricultural subsidy, tariffs, import quotas, and settlement of trade disputes that cannot be bilaterally resolved. Where trade barriers are raised on the disputed grounds of public health and safety, the WTO refer the dispute to the Codex Alimentarius Commission, which was founded in 1962 by the United Nations Food and Agriculture Organization and the World Health Organization. Trade liberalization has greatly affected world food trade.

=== Marketing and retailing ===
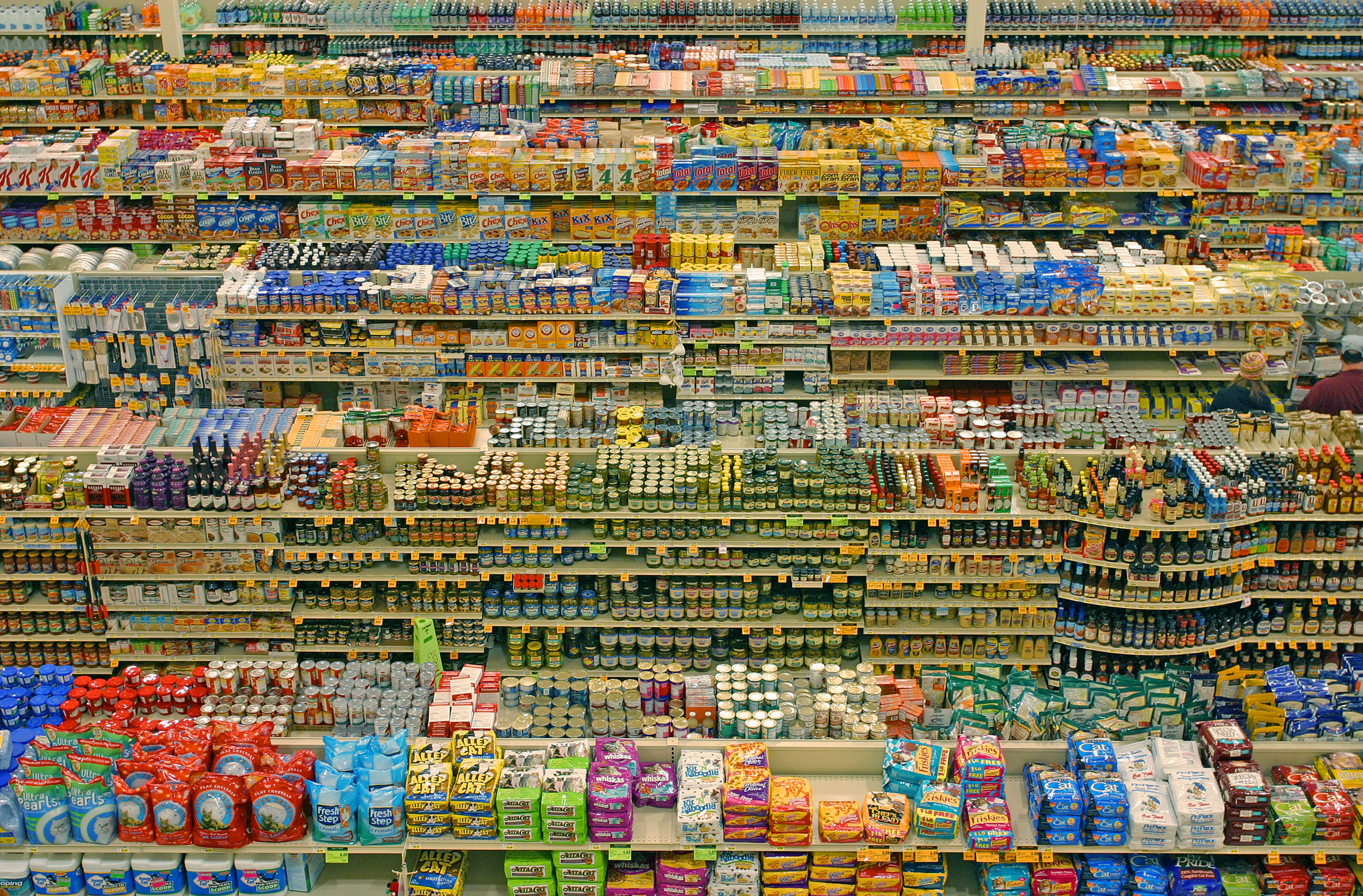
Packaged food aisles of supermarket in Portland, Oregon, United States

Food marketing brings together the producer and the consumer. The marketing of even a single food product can be a complicated process involving many producers and companies. For example, 56 companies are involved in making one can of chicken noodle soup. These businesses include not only chicken and vegetable processors but also the companies that transport the ingredients and those that print labels and manufacture cans. The food marketing system is the largest direct and indirect non-government employer in the United States.

In the pre-modern era, the sale of surplus food took place once a week when farmers took their wares on market day into the local village marketplace. Here food was sold to grocers for sale in their local shops for purchase by local consumers. With the onset of industrialization and the development of the food processing industry, a wider range of food could be sold and distributed in distant locations. Typically early grocery shops would be counter-based shops, in which purchasers told the shopkeeper what they wanted so that the shopkeeper could get it for them.

In the 20th century, supermarkets were born. Supermarkets brought with them a selfservice approach to shopping using shopping carts and were able to offer quality food at a lower cost through economies of scale and reduced staffing costs. In the latter part of the 20th century, this has been further revolutionized by the development of vast warehouse-sized, out-of-town supermarkets, selling a wide range of food from around the world.

Unlike food processors, food retailing is a two-tier market in which a small number of very large companies control a large proportion of supermarkets. The supermarket giants wield great purchasing power over farmers and processors, and strong influence over consumers. Nevertheless, less than 10% of consumer spending on food goes to farmers, with larger percentages going to advertising, transportation, and intermediate corporations.

=== Access ===
Access to food is an economical and a sociological issue. Disadvantaged people typically live further away from providers of healthy food than the middle class. A study of 94 million visits to food retailers showed that Americans travel a median distance of 5.95 km (3.7 miles) each time they buy food.

=== Prices ===
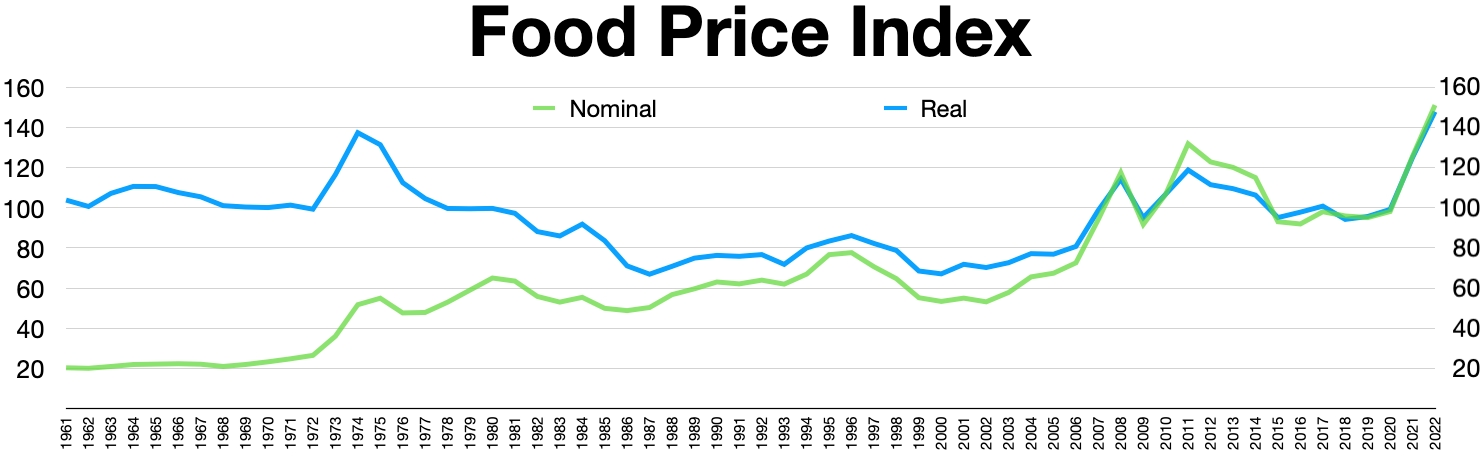
The Food and Agriculture Organization (FAO) Food Price Index 1961–2021 in nominal and real terms. The Real Price Index is the Nominal Price Index deflated by the World Bank Manufactures Unit Value Index (MUV). Years 2014–2016 is 100.

Food prices refer to the average price level for food across countries, regions and on a global scale. Food prices affect producers and consumers of food. Price levels depend on the food production process, including food marketing and food distribution. Fluctuation in food prices is determined by a number of compounding factors. Geopolitical events, global demand, exchange rates, government policy, diseases and crop yield, energy costs, availability of natural resources for agriculture, food speculation, changes in the use of soil and weather events directly affect food prices. To a certain extent, adverse price trends can be counteracted by food politics.

The consequences of food price fluctuation are multiple. Increases in food prices, or agflation, endangers food security, particularly for developing countries, and can cause social unrest. Increases in food prices is related to disparities in diet quality and health, particularly among vulnerable populations, such as women and children.

Food prices will on average continue to rise due to a variety of reasons. Growing world population will put more pressure on the supply and demand. Climate change will increase extreme weather events, including droughts, storms and heavy rain, and overall increases in temperature will affect food production.

An intervention to reduce food loss or waste, if sufficiently large, will affect prices upstream and downstream in the supply chain relative to where the intervention occurred. "The CPI (Consumer Price Index) for all food increased 0.8% from July 2022 to August 2022, and food prices were 11.4% higher than in August 2021."

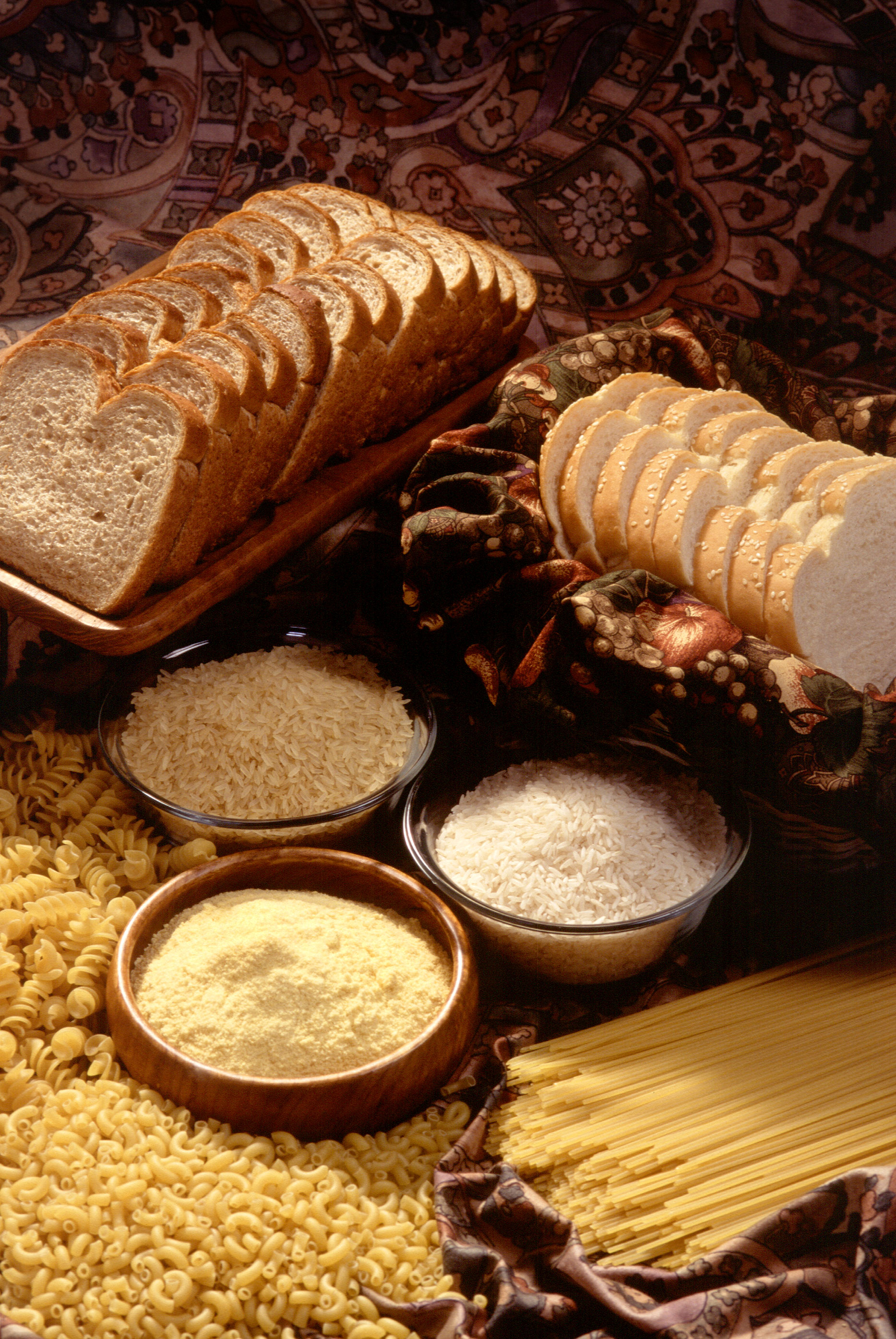
Some essential food products including bread, rice and pasta

=== As investment ===
Food speculation refers to the buying and selling of futures contracts or other commodity derivatives by traders with the aim of profiting from changes in food prices. Food speculation can be both positive and negative for food producers and buyers. It is betting on food prices in financial markets.

Food speculation by global players like banks, hedge funds or pension funds is alleged to cause price swings in staple foods such as wheat, maize and soy – even though too large price swings in an idealized economy are theoretically ruled out: Adam Smith in 1776 reasoned that the only way to make money from commodities trading is by buying low and selling high, which has the effect of smoothing out price swings and mitigating shortages. For the actors, the apparently random swings are predictable, which means potential huge profits. For the global poor, food speculation and resulting price peaks may result in increased poverty or even famine.

In contrast to food hoarding, speculation does not mean that real food shortages or scarcity need to be evoked, the price changes are only due to trading activity. Food speculation may be a reason for agflation. The 2007–08 world food price crisis is thought to have been be partially caused by such speculation.

== Problems ==
MyPlate replaced MyPyramid as the USDA nutrition guide.

Because of its centrality to human life, problems related to access, quality and production of food effect every aspect of human life.

=== Nutrition and dietary problems ===
Between the extremes of optimal health and death from starvation or malnutrition, there is an array of disease states that can be caused or alleviated by changes in diet. Deficiencies, excesses, and imbalances in diet can produce negative impacts on health, which may lead to various health problems such as scurvy, obesity, or osteoporosis, diabetes, cardiovascular diseases as well as psychological and behavioral problems. The science of nutrition attempts to understand how and why specific dietary aspects influence health.

Nutrients in food are grouped into several categories. Macronutrients are fat, protein, and carbohydrates. Micronutrients are the minerals and vitamins. Additionally, food contains water and dietary fiber.

As previously discussed, the body is designed by natural selection to enjoy sweet and fattening foods for evolutionary diets, ideal for hunters and gatherers. Thus, sweet and fattening foods in nature are typically rare and are very pleasurable to eat. In modern times these foods are easily available to consumers, which promotes obesity in adults and children alike.

=== Hunger and starvation ===
Food deprivation leads to malnutrition and ultimately starvation. This is often connected with famine, which involves the absence of food in entire communities. This can have a devastating and widespread effect on human health and mortality. Rationing is sometimes used to distribute food in times of shortage, most notably during times of war.

Starvation is a significant international problem. Approximately 815 million people are undernourished, and over 16,000 children die per day from hunger-related causes. Food deprivation is regarded as a deficit need in Maslow's hierarchy of needs and is measured using famine scales.

=== Food waste ===
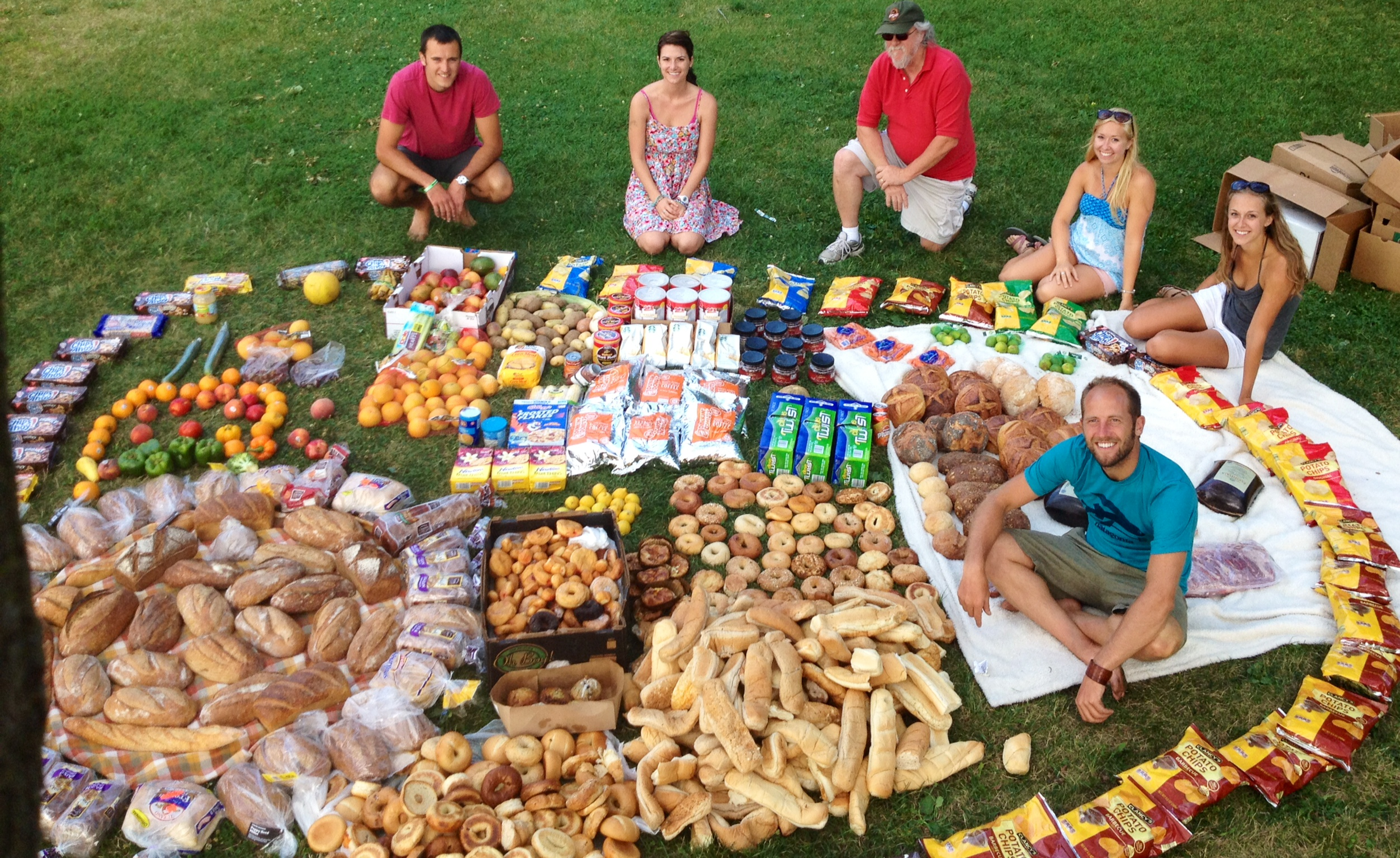
Food recovered by food waste critic Robin Greenfield in Madison, Wisconsin, from two days of recovery from dumpsters

Food loss and waste is food that is discarded or otherwise lost uneaten. This occurs throughout all the processes involved in the food system, during production, processing, distribution, retail, and consumption, but most food waste is created after consumers buy the food. Overall, about one-third of the world's food is thrown away, and a huge amount of resources used in food production are wasted. Global food waste amounts to 931 million tonnes annually (about 121 kg per person) across three sectors: 61 percent from households, 26 percent from food service and 13 percent from retail.

Food waste is addressed through prevention (e.g. by food preservation), reuse (e.g. food donation), animal feed, or recycling. Discarding food in landfills is to be avoided because it is a major source of the greenhouse gas methane. Reducing food waste in all parts of the food system is an important part of reducing the environmental impact of agriculture, by reducing the total amount of water, land, and other resources used.

Wasted food is a major part of the impact of agriculture on climate change (it amounts to 3.3 billion tons of carbon dioxide equivalent emissions annually) and other environmental issues, such as land use, water use and loss of biodiversity. It also conflicts with food insecurity in parts of the world. The UN's Sustainable Development Goals seek to "halve global per capita food waste at the retail and consumer levels and reduce food losses along production and supply chains, including post-harvest losses" by 2030. In the 2022 United Nations Biodiversity Conference nations agreed to reduce food waste by 50% by the year 2030.

== Policy ==
Food policy is the area of public policy concerning how food is produced, processed, distributed, purchased, or provided. Food policies are designed to influence the operation of the food and agriculture system balanced with ensuring human health needs. This often includes decision-making around production and processing techniques, marketing, availability, utilization, and consumption of food, in the interest of meeting or furthering social objectives. Food policy can be promulgated on any level, from local to global, and by a government agency, business, or organization. Food policymakers engage in activities such as regulation of food-related industries, establishing eligibility standards for food assistance programs for the poor, ensuring safety of the food supply, food labeling, and even the qualifications of a product to be considered organic.

Rice

Most food policy is initiated at the domestic level for purposes of ensuring a safe and adequate food supply for the citizenry. In a developing nation, there are three main objectives for food policy: to protect the poor from crises, to develop long-run markets that enhance efficient resource use, and to increase food production that will in turn promote an increase in income.

Food policy comprises the mechanisms by which food-related matters are addressed or administered by governments, including international bodies or networks, and by public institutions or private organizations. Agricultural producers often bear the burden of governments' desire to keep food prices sufficiently low for growing urban populations. Low prices for consumers can be a disincentive for farmers to produce more food, often resulting in hunger, poor trade prospects, and an increased need for food imports.

In a more developed country such as the United States, food and nutrition policy must be viewed in context with regional and national economic concerns, environmental pressures, maintenance of a social safety net, health, encouragement of private enterprise and innovation, and an agrarian landscape dominated by fewer, larger mechanized farms. Industrialized countries strive to ensure that farmers earn relatively stable incomes despite price and supply fluctuations and adverse weather events. The cost of subsidizing farm incomes is passed along to consumers in the form of higher food prices.

=== Legal definition ===
Some countries list a legal definition of food, often referring them with the word foodstuff. These countries list food as any item that is to be processed, partially processed, or unprocessed for consumption. The listing of items included as food includes any substance intended to be, or reasonably expected to be, ingested by humans. In addition to these foodstuffs, drink, chewing gum, water, or other items processed into said food items are part of the legal definition of food. Items not included in the legal definition of food include animal feed, live animals (unless being prepared for sale in a market), plants before harvesting, medicinal products, cosmetics, tobacco and tobacco products, narcotic or psychotropic substances, and residues and contaminants.

=== Right to food ===
Right to food around the world, as of 2011–2012: Adopted or drafting a framework law (19) Constitutional, explicit as a right (23) Constitutional, implicit in broader rights or as directive principle (41) Direct applicability via international treaties (103) Committed by ratifying the International Covenant on Economic, Social and Cultural Rights (160) No known right to food Note: The same country can fall in multiple categories; the colour given to a country corresponds to the highest listed category in which a country falls.

The right to food, and its variations, is a human right protecting the right of people to feed themselves in dignity, implying that sufficient food is available, that people have the means to access it, and that it adequately meets the individual's dietary needs. The right to food protects the right of all human beings to be free from hunger, food insecurity, and malnutrition.

The right is derived from the International Covenant on Economic, Social and Cultural Rights which has 170 state parties as of April 2020. States that sign the covenant agree to take steps to the maximum of their available resources to achieve progressively the full realization of the right to adequate food, both nationally and internationally. In a total of 106 countries the right to food is applicable either via constitutional arrangements of various forms or via direct applicability in law of various international treaties in which the right to food is protected.

At the 1996 World Food Summit, governments reaffirmed the right to food and committed themselves to halve the number of hungry and malnourished from 840 to 420 million by 2015. However, the number has increased over the past years, reaching an infamous record in 2009 of more than 1 billion undernourished people worldwide. Furthermore, the number who suffer from hidden hunger – micronutrient deficiences that may cause stunted bodily and intellectual growth in children – amounts to over 2 billion people worldwide.

Whilst under international law, states are obliged to respect, protect and fulfill the right to food, the practical difficulties in achieving this human right are demonstrated by prevalent food insecurity across the world, and ongoing litigation in countries such as India. In the continents with the biggest food-related problems – Africa, Asia and South America – not only is there shortage of food and lack of infrastructure but also maldistribution and inadequate access to food.

The Human Rights Measurement Initiative measures the right to food for countries around the world, based on their level of income.

=== Food security ===
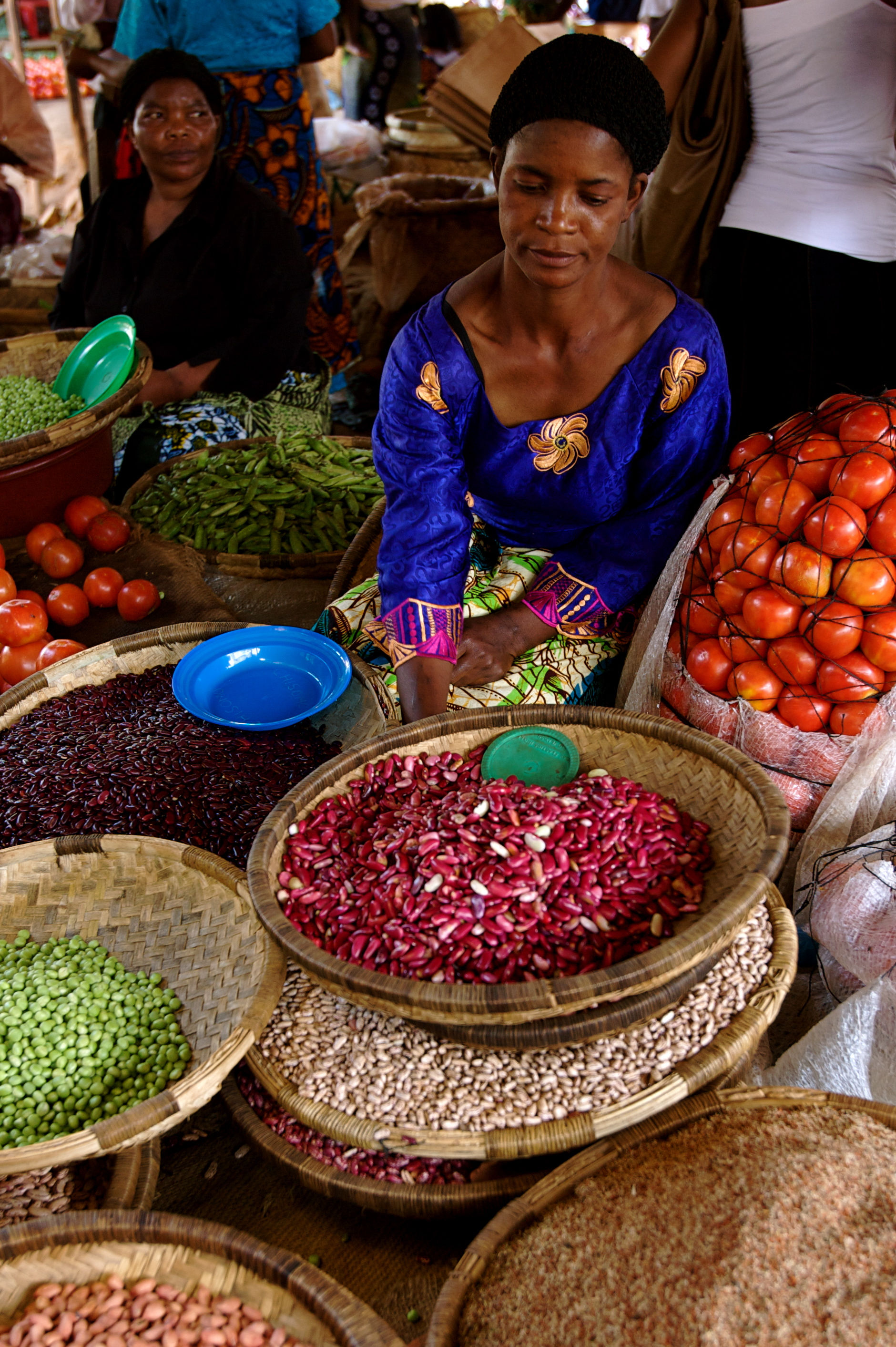
Women selling produce at a market in Lilongwe, Malawi

Food security is the state of having reliable access to a sufficient quantity of affordable, healthy food. The availability of food for people of any class, gender, status, ethnicity, or religion is another element of food protection. Similarly, household food security is considered to exist when all the members of a family have consistent access to enough food for an active, healthy life. Food-secure individuals do not live in hunger or fear of starvation. Food security includes resilience to future disruptions of food supply. Such a disruption could occur due to various risk factors such as droughts and floods, shipping disruptions, fuel shortages, economic instability, and wars. Food insecurity is the opposite of food security: a state where there is only limited or uncertain availability of suitable food.

The concept of food security has evolved over time. The four pillars of food security include availability, access, utilization, and stability. In addition, there are two more dimensions that are important: agency and sustainability. These six dimensions of food security are reinforced in conceptual and legal understandings of the right to food. The World Food Summit in 1996 declared that "food should not be used as an instrument for political and economic pressure."

Food insecurity goes beyond hunger; it includes people who do not have regular access to nutritious and sufficient food, even if they may not necessarily be suffering from hunger. In 2024, an estimated 28.0 percent of the world population, or 2.28 billion people, has experienced food insecurity at moderate or severe levels. There are many causes of food insecurity. The most important ones are high food prices and disruptions in global food supplies for example due to war. Climate change, water scarcity, land degradation, agricultural diseases, pandemics and disease outbreaks can also create food insecurity. Additionally, food insecurity affects individuals with low socioeconomic status, affects the health of a population on an individual level, and causes divisions in interpersonal relationships. Food insecurity due to unemployment causes a higher rate of poverty.

The effects of food insecurity can include hunger and even famines. Chronic food insecurity translates into a high degree of vulnerability to hunger and famine. Chronic hunger and malnutrition in childhood can lead to stunted growth of children. Once stunting has occurred, improved nutritional intake after the age of about two years is unable to reverse the damage. Severe malnutrition in early childhood often leads to defects in cognitive development.

About 2.3 billion people in the world are estimated to have been moderately or severely food insecure in 2024. The global prevalence of moderate or severe food insecurity has declined gradually since 2021, reaching 28.0% in 2024. Food insecurity is on the rise in Africa and falling in Latin America and the Caribbean; it has been decreasing gradually in Asia for several consecutive years, while in Oceania and in Northern America and Europe, new estimates point to a slight decline from 2023 to 2024 following a several-year rise. Globally and in almost every region, food insecurity is more prevalent in rural areas than in urban areas.

=== International aid ===
Food aid can benefit people suffering from a shortage of food. It can be used to improve peoples' lives in the short term, so that a society can increase its standard of living to the point that food aid is no longer required. Conversely, badly managed food aid can create problems by disrupting local markets, depressing crop prices, and discouraging food production. Sometimes a cycle of food aid dependence can develop. Its provision, or threatened withdrawal, is sometimes used as a political tool to influence the policies of the destination country, a strategy known as food politics. Sometimes, food aid provisions will require certain types of food be purchased from certain sellers, and food aid can be misused to enhance the markets of donor countries. International efforts to distribute food to the neediest countries are often coordinated by the World Food Programme.

== Safety ==
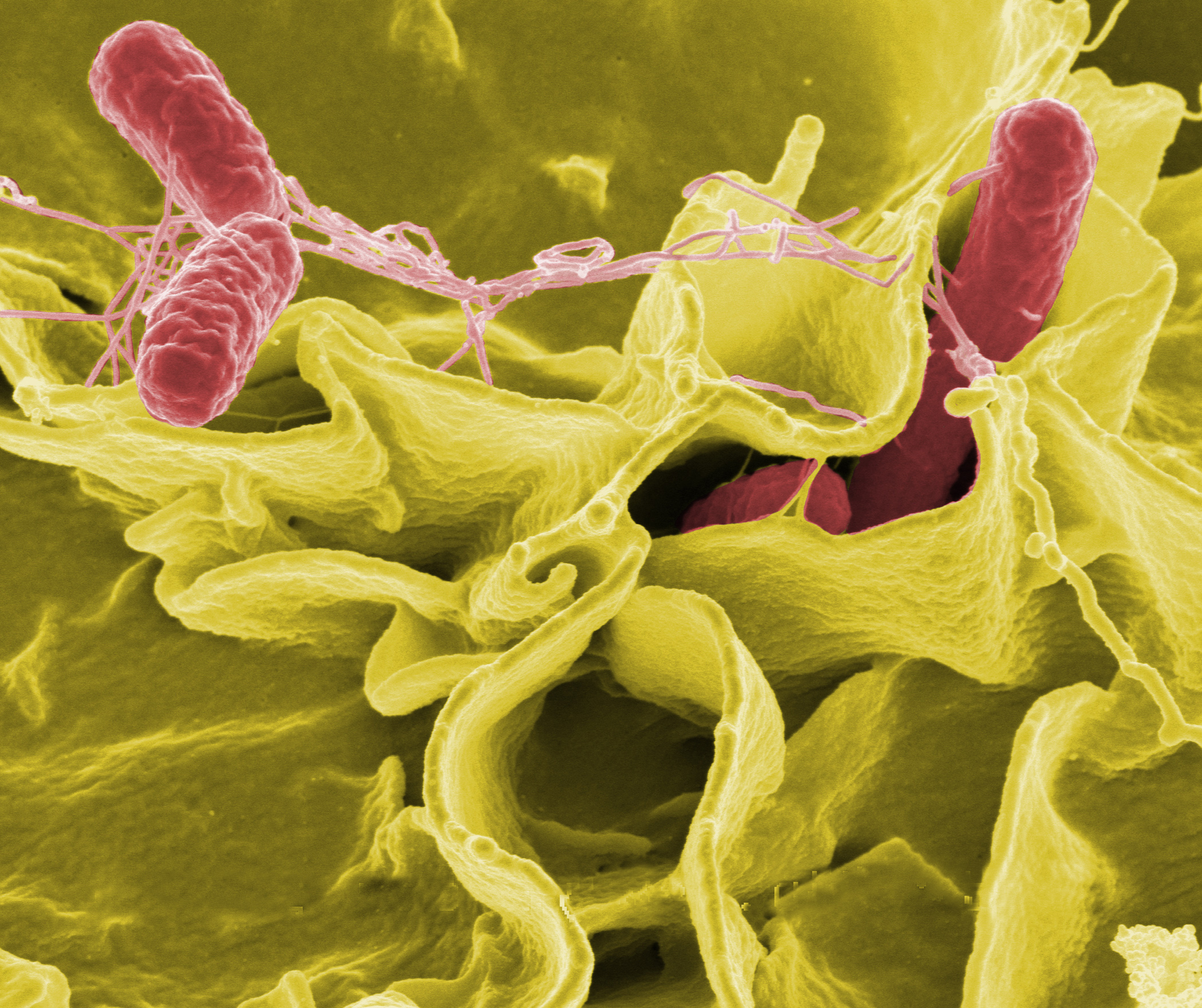
Salmonella bacteria is a common cause of foodborne illness, particularly in undercooked chicken and chicken eggs.

Foodborne illness, commonly called "food poisoning", is caused by bacteria, toxins, viruses, parasites, and prions. Roughly 7 million people die of food poisoning each year, with about 10 times as many suffering from a non-fatal version. The two most common factors leading to cases of bacterial foodborne illness are cross-contamination of ready-to-eat food from other uncooked foods and improper temperature control. Less commonly, acute adverse reactions can also occur if chemical contamination of food occurs, for example from improper storage, or use of non-food grade soaps and disinfectants. Food can also be adulterated by a very wide range of articles (known as "foreign bodies") during farming, manufacture, cooking, packaging, distribution, or sale. These foreign bodies can include pests or their droppings, hairs, cigarette butts, wood chips, and all manner of other contaminants. Certain types of food can become contaminated if stored or presented in an unsafe container, such as a ceramic pot with lead-based glaze.

Food poisoning has been recognized as a disease since as early as Hippocrates. The sale of rancid, contaminated, or adulterated food was commonplace until the introduction of hygiene, refrigeration, and vermin controls in the 19th century. Discovery of techniques for killing bacteria using heat, and other microbiological studies by scientists such as Louis Pasteur, contributed to the modern sanitation standards that are ubiquitous in developed nations today. This was further underpinned by the work of Justus von Liebig, which led to the development of modern food storage and food preservation methods. In more recent years, a greater understanding of the causes of food-borne illnesses has led to the development of more systematic approaches such as the Hazard Analysis and Critical Control Points (HACCP), which can identify and eliminate many risks.

Recommended measures for ensuring food safety include maintaining a clean preparation area with foods of different types kept separate, ensuring an adequate cooking temperature, and refrigerating foods promptly after cooking.

Foods that spoil easily, such as meats, dairy, and seafood, must be prepared a certain way to avoid contaminating the people for whom they are prepared. As such, the rule of thumb is that cold foods (such as dairy products) should be kept cold and hot foods (such as soup) should be kept hot until storage. Cold meats, such as chicken, that are to be cooked should not be placed at room temperature for thawing, at the risk of dangerous bacterial growth, such as Salmonella or E. coli.

=== Allergies ===
Some people have allergies or sensitivities to foods that are not problematic to most people. This occurs when a person's immune system mistakes a certain food protein for a harmful foreign agent and attacks it. About 2% of adults and 8% of children have a food allergy. The amount of the food substance required to provoke a reaction in a particularly susceptible individual can be quite small. In some instances, traces of food in the air, too minute to be perceived through smell, have been known to provoke lethal reactions in extremely sensitive individuals. Common food allergens are gluten, corn, shellfish (mollusks), peanuts, and soy. Allergens frequently produce symptoms such as diarrhea, rashes, bloating, vomiting, and regurgitation. The digestive complaints usually develop within half an hour of ingesting the allergen.

Rarely, food allergies can lead to a medical emergency, such as anaphylactic shock, hypotension (low blood pressure), and loss of consciousness. An allergen associated with this type of reaction is peanut, although latex products can induce similar reactions. Initial treatment is with epinephrine (adrenaline), often carried by known patients in the form of an Epi-pen or Twinject.

=== Other health issues ===
Human diet was estimated to cause perhaps around 35% of cancers in a human epidemiological analysis by Richard Doll and Richard Peto in 1981. These cancers may be caused by carcinogens that are present in food naturally or as contaminants. Food contaminated with fungal growth may contain mycotoxins such as aflatoxins which may be found in contaminated corn and peanuts. Other carcinogens identified in food include heterocyclic amines generated in meat when cooked at high temperature, polyaromatic hydrocarbons in charred meat and smoked fish, and nitrosamines generated from nitrites used as food preservatives in cured meat such as bacon.

Anticarcinogens that may help prevent cancer can also be found in many foods especially fruit and vegetables. Antioxidants are important groups of compounds that may help remove potentially harmful chemicals. It is however often difficult to identify the specific components in diet that serve to increase or decrease cancer risk since many foods, such as beef steak and broccoli, contain low concentrations of both carcinogens and anticarcinogens. There are many international certifications in the cooking field, such as Monde Selection, A.A. Certification, iTQi. They use high-quality evaluation methods to make the food safer.

== Diet ==
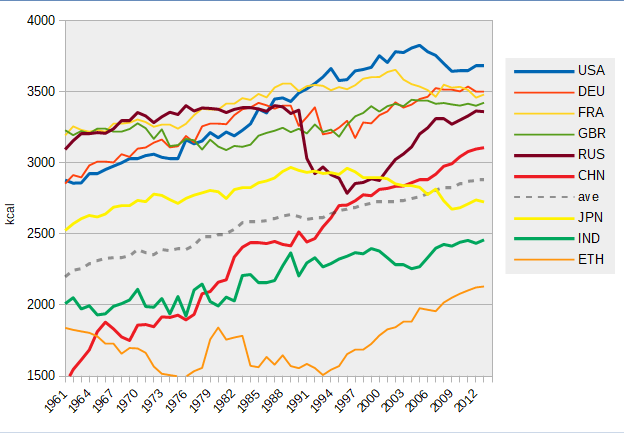
Changes of food supply (by energy) Other area (Yr 2010) * Africa, sub-Sahara – 2170 kcal/capita/day * N.E. and N. Africa – 3120 kcal/capita/day * South Asia – 2450 kcal/capita/day * East Asia – 3040 kcal/capita/day * Latin America / Caribbean – 2950 kcal/capita/day * Developed countries - 3470 kcal/capita/day

=== Cultural and religious diets ===
Many cultures hold some food preferences and some food taboos. Dietary choices can also define cultures and play a role in religion. For example, only Kosher foods are permitted by Judaism, halal foods by Islam, and in Hinduism beef is restricted. In addition, the dietary choices of different countries or regions have different characteristics. This is highly related to a culture's cuisine.

=== Diet deficiencies ===
Dietary habits play a significant role in the health and mortality of all humans. Imbalances between the consumed fuels and expended energy results in either starvation or excessive reserves of adipose tissue, known as body fat. Poor intake of various vitamins and minerals can lead to diseases that can have far-reaching effects on health. For instance, 30% of the world's population either has, or is at risk for developing, iodine deficiency. It is estimated that at least 3 million children are blind due to vitamin A deficiency. Vitamin C deficiency results in scurvy. Calcium, vitamin D, and phosphorus are inter-related; the consumption of each may affect the absorption of the others. Kwashiorkor and marasmus are childhood disorders caused by lack of dietary protein.

=== Moral, ethical, and health-conscious diets ===
Many individuals limit what foods they eat for reasons of morality or other habits. For instance, vegetarians choose to forgo food from animal sources to varying degrees due to concerns about animal welfare and negative impacts on humans due to environmental impacts of animal agriculture among other reasons. Others choose a healthier diet, avoiding sugars or animal fats and increasing consumption of dietary fiber and antioxidants like various polyphenols. Obesity, a serious problem in the world, leads to higher chances of developing heart disease, diabetes, cancer and many other diseases. More recently, dietary habits have been influenced by the concerns that some people have about possible impacts on health or the environment from genetically modified food. Further concerns about the impact of industrial farming on animal welfare, human health, and the environment are also affecting contemporary human dietary habits. This has in part led to the emergence of movements with a preference for organic and local food. There is increasing interest and research about optimizing diets for life extension and improved healthspans.

== See also ==
- Bulk foods
- Beverages
- Food and Bioprocess Technology
- Food engineering
- Food, Inc., a 2009 documentary
- Food science
- Future food technology
- Industrial crop
- Lists of foods
- Lists of prepared foods
- Optimal foraging theory
- Outline of cooking
- Outline of nutrition
- Right to food by country
