= Sandro Dernini =

- Born: 1949 (age 76–77); Cagliari, Sardinia, Italy
- Education: New York University; University of Cagliari
- Occupations: visual artist, curator, biochemist
- Organization: Forum on Mediterranean Food Cultures

Sandro Dernini (born 1949 in Cagliari, Sardinia, Italy) is an Italian visual artist, curator, and biochemist.

Dernini is the chairman of the Forum on Mediterranean Food Cultures.

He obtained his PhD from the School of Education of New York University and his doctorate in biology from the University of Cagliari in Italy.

As an art curator and impresario, he is the founder of Plexus International, an international cooperative arts organizations whose participants have included Butch Morris, Lorenzo Pace, Miguel Algarin, William Parker, Shalom Neuman, and Stephen DiLauro. At one point Dernini and Plexus had a performance space on West 25th Street in Manhattan. One of his artistic creations is the Black Box, a time capsule in the form of a book which documents over 25 years of "Plexus International" artistic activity.

With the American/New Zealand nutrition scientist Barbara Burlingame, he has edited several volumes including Sustainable Diets and Biodiversity Directions and solutions for policy, research and action Food and Agriculture Organization of the United Nations (FAO, Rome), 2012].
