= Ukulele (disambiguation) =

The ukulele is a small stringed instrument with four strings.

Ukulele may also refer to:

- Cliff Edwards, known as "Ukulele Ike", an American singer
- "Ukulele Lady", a song by Gus Kahn and Richard A. Whiting
- "Ukulele", a song by Jay Chou from the 2012 album Opus 12
- Ukulele Baby!, an album by The Wiggles
- Several orchestras:
  - Langley Ukulele Ensemble
  - New York Ukulele Ensemble
  - Ukulele Orchestra of Great Britain
  - Wellington International Ukulele Orchestra
- Ukulele (Taiwanese band), a Taiwanese pop duet
- Yooka-Laylee, a 2017 3D platform game
