= Arturo Lindsay =

Panamanian American artist

Arturo Lindsay (born September 29, 1946) is a Panamanian-born artist and professor of art and art history at Spelman College. His scholarship specializes in ethnographic research on African spiritual and aesthetic retentions in contemporary American cultures. His Panamanian/American identity is reflected in his art, which focuses on African culture in America.

== Early life and education ==
Lindsay was born in Colón, Panama on September 29, 1946, and grew up in Brooklyn, New York. He attended graduate school at the University of Massachusetts Amherst. Lindsay studied with AfriCOBRA member Nelson Stevens, Lionel Góngora, a Colombian artist and a founding member of Nueva Presencia and Salón Independiente in Mexico, Dr. Nana Nkestsia, Kwame Nkruma’s first Minister of Art and Culture in Ghana.

== Career ==
Lindsay began his career as a theater artist acting in and directing street theater projects in New York City and New England. In 1976 he worked in Hartford, Connecticut as an artist for the CETA Youth Summer Program. While pursuing a doctorate degree at New York University Lindsay began working with fellow student Sandro Dernini, the originator of Plexus International. Lindsay became a founding member of Plexus New York. This multinational group of artists began creating large-scale collaborative art projects known as co-operas during the 1980s in New York City’s Lower East Side. Lindsay continues creating Plexus based projects in Atlanta, Georgia, and Portobelo, Panama.

In the mid-1990s Lindsay returned to Panama, where he co-founded the Painting Workshop of Taller Portobelo; an artist cooperative dedicated to preserving the traditions of the Congos who are descendants of cimarrones – enslaved Africans that liberated themselves in wars fought against the Spanish Empire. He later founded the Spelman College Summer Art Colony, which provides students and emerging artists from the United States and Panama with an opportunity to create works of art in the rainforest of Portobelo, Panama.

In 2006, Lindsay was the Distinguished Batza Family Chair at Colgate University and the Kemp Distinguished Visiting Professor at Davidson College in Davidson, NC in 2005. Lindsay also received a Fulbright Senior Scholar Award in 1999. He has been selected to be a part of the smARTpower project that is funded by the U.S. Department of State’s Bureau of Educational and Cultural Affairs and administered by the Bronx Museum of the Arts.

Lindsay's 2008 solo exhibition, Love, at the Museum of Contemporary African Diasporian Art, involves the use of "ashé", which is the Yoruba concept for the life force found in all things. In 2009 he was commissioned to create a sculpture for the Smithsonian Institution’s Latino Center Legacy Awards.

== Recent career ==
Lindsay is the editor of Santería Aesthetics in Contemporary Latin American Art and has lectured and published several articles and catalogue essays on contemporary art theory and practice with a focus on the art and aesthetics of the African Diaspora.

In recent years Lindsay has been creating sustainable architecture, biodegradable sculptures and time specific large-scale installations and sculptures at Las Orquídeas Environmental Sculpture Park in Portobelo, Panama. He designed the railings and medallions for the Judge Lenwood Jackson Justice Center in Atlanta, and paintings of Bayano and Felipillo, for Frank O. Gehry’s new museum, Museo de La Biodiversidad in Panama.

Lindsay collaborated with poets Opal Moore and Sharan Strange, musician Joseph Jennings, set designer Paul Thomason, production coordinator, Dan Bascelli, choreographer T. Lang and soprano Laura English Robinson to create a performance entitled "Artists Contemplating Torture". It was presented in Portobelo, Panama, Cape Town, South Africa and Atlanta, Georgia, and was based on Lindsay's earlier work "Artists Contemplating the Fate of Those Who Speak of Freedom".

Lindsay took part in a U.S. Department of State initiative called smARTpower) which partnered the Bronx Museum of the Arts and Medrar for Contemporary Art in Egypt, in an experiment in one-to-one diplomacy through the visual arts. The project documented social-media based experiences in the lives of ordinary Middle East youth.

In 2016 Lindsay retired from teaching at Spelman College.

== Selected solo exhibitions ==
- 1993 El Monte: A Tribute to Lydia Cabrera, Franklin Furnace, New York, NY
- 1994 Canto a la Libertad de Africa a America, Museo de Arte Contemporaneo, Panama, Panama
- 1994 Congo Spirits, Chassie Post Gallery, Atlanta, GA
- 1996 Animas, arcángeles y antepasados: Recent Work by Arturo Lindsay – Nexus Contemporary Art Center, Atlanta, GA; also Intermedia Art Center (1997), Minneapolis, MN; Diggs Gallery, Winston-Salem State University (1998)
- 1999 Retorno de las ánimas Africanas, Segunda Bienal Iberoaméricana de Lima – Salones de Artistas Invitados, Pancho Fierro, Lima, Peru
- 2004 Mapping Ports: Sullivan’s Island, Goreé Island, Portobelo, Havana and Seville, a retrospective exhibition, City Gallery at Waterfront, Charleston, SC.
- 2007 Arturo Lindsay: Love – Museum of Contemporary African Diasporan Art, Brooklyn, NY; also Chase Gallery, Bates College (2008), Lewiston, ME
- 2013 Arturo Lindsay: Portraits of Yemaya, (forthcoming), Chastain Art Center, Atlanta, GA

== Selected group exhibitions ==
- 1991 Southern Expressions: Tales Untold, High Museum of Art, Atlanta, GA
- 1993 Ceremony of Spirit: Nature & Memory in Contemporary Latino Art, The Mexican Museum, San Francisco, CA; also Western Washington University (1994), Studio Museum in Harlem (1995); Laguna Gloria Art Museum (1995); Boise Art Museum (1996); Fresno Metropolitan Museum (1996)
- 1996 Art in Atlanta (A traveling exhibition organized by Artist-in-Residence International)
- 1996 Plexus Performance/Installation: The Ark of the Well Being, Palazzo del Esposizioni, Roof Garden, Rome, Italy
- 1997 In Search of Balance: The ArtistScholar, Smithsonian Institution, Washington, DC
- 1997 ES97 – Salón Internacional de Estandartes, Centro Cultural Tijuana, and Museo Rufino Tamayo, Mexico City
- 1998 Percorsi dello Spirito, Cittadella dei Musei Piazza Arsenale, Organized by Centro Culturale Man Ray, Cagliari, Italy
- 1999 Locating the Spirit: Religion and Spirituality in African American Art, Smithsonian Institution, Anacostia Museum and the Center for African American History and Culture, Washington, DC
- 2000 Panameños en la bienal de Lima, Museo de Arte Contemporaneo, Panama, Panama
- 2000 Percorsi dello Spirito Anno Duemila, EXMA Centro Culturale D'Arte e Cultura, Cagliari, Italy
- 2001 Santuario de los reyes, una obra collectiva del Taller Portobelo, XVI Festival Iberoamericano de Teatro, Cadiz, Spain
- 2007 Kindred Spirits, a two-man show with Fahamu Pecou, Georgia College and State University, Milledgeville, GA
- 2007 Tradiciones Afro Caribeñas: Espiritualidad, Arte y Resistencia, Casa Escute, Municipio Aútonomo de Carolina, Carolina, P.R.
- 2012 Caribbean: Crossroads of the World, Studio Museum in Harlem and the Queens Museum, New York, NY

== Selected residencies ==
- 2003 Rockefeller Foundation, Bellagio Fellowship, Bellagio, Italy
- 2002 UNCF Mellon Faculty Seminar at Goree Institute with Wole Soyinka, Goree, Senegal
- 1994 Lila Wallace-Reader's Digest International Artist Residency Award, Portobelo, Panama

== Selected art projects and performances ==
- 1994 Plexus Interactive Art & Science Project, Cagliari Museum, Sardinia, Italy
- 2008 Artist Contemplating the Fate of Those Who Speak f Freedom – Las Orquídeas Environmental Sculpture Park, Portobelo, Panama and Castle of Good Hope, Cape Town, SA
- 2008 Artist Contemplating Torture a performance art ritual. In collaboration with poet Opal Moore, musician Joe Jennings, filmmaker Ayoka Chenzira and others. Spelman College, Atlanta, GA
- 2010 Los abanicos de Portobelo, Las Orquídeas Environmental Sculpture Park, Portobelo, Panama
- 2010 Sanctuary on the BeltLine, The BeltLine, Inc., Atlanta, GA
- 2012 Bearing Witness: The Stories of Ordinary People Living During Extra-ordinary Times a multi-disciplinary performance art ritual/installation. Organized by smARTpower a Joint State Department and The Bronx Museum of Art project. Spelman College, Atlanta, GA and Medrar for Contemporary Art, Cairo, Egypt

== Awards and recognitions ==
- 1999 Fulbright Senior Scholar Award, The J. William Fulbright Foreign Scholarship Board
- 1996 Commissioned Artist, “17 Days of the Olympics” Hartsfield International Airport, Atlanta, GA
- 1996 Commissioned Artist, Nexus Contemporary Art Center, Corporation for Olympic Development in Atlanta

== Scholarly publications ==
- 2011 “Investigating the Aesthetics of Ashé,” in Actualidad de las Tradiciones Espirituales y Culturales Africanas en el Caribe y Latinoamérica, Primer y Segundo Simposio, compiled by María Elba Muñoz, Marta Moreno Vega and Mónica Cortes, edited by José Carvajal. Puerto Rico: Centro de Estudios Avanzados de Puerto Rico y el Caribe and Instituto de las Tradiciones Afrocaribeñas.
- 2008 “Understanding the Aesthetics of New Pop/NEOPOP,” in Fahamenon, Special; Collector’sIssue, Raleigh, NC: Flanders Art Gallery.
- 2004 “Santería Aesthetics: a Yoruba-Cuban Phenomenon,” in Encyclopedia of African-American Culture and History: The Black Experience in the Americas. Editor in Chief: Colin Palmer. Board Editors: Lisa Gail Collins; Marcyliena Morgan; Faith Smith; James Sweet; Robert Reid-Pharr. New York: Macmillan Reference USA.
- 2004 "The Congos of Panama,” Encyclopedia of African-American Culture and History: The Black Experience in the Americas. Editor in Chief: Colin Palmer.
- 2003 “The Research Methods of an Artist-Ethnographer on the Congo Coast of Panama,” in Breaking the Disciplines: Reconceptions in Knowledge, Art & Culture, edited by Marsha Meskimmon and Martin Davies. London: I.B. Tauris House.
- 2003 “Albert Chong: ‘It’s Complex,’” in Fresh Talk/Daring Gazes: Asian American Issues in Contemporary Art, edited by Elaine Kim, Margo Machido and Sharon Mizota. University of California Press.
- 2003 "Niveles de Conocimiento/Niveles de Entendimiento: El Arte de Hochi Asiatico. Layers of Knowledge/Layers of Understanding: The Art of Hochi Asiatico,” a bilingual museum catalog essay for the exhibition Hochi Asiatico, Metamorfosis de los Dioses. Habana, Cuba: Galeria Latinoamericana, Casa de las Américas.
- 1993 “Mestizaje and the Postmodern Aesthetic,” a museum catalog essay for the exhibition Ceremony of Spirit - Nature and Memory in Contemporary Latino Art. Curated by Amalia Mesa-Bains. The Mexican Museum, San Francisco, CA
