= Plexus International =

Art collective

Plexus International is a global arts collective that was founded in 1982 in New York City. The group is known for their collaborative, experimental art events as well as their theory of "artist in the first person" as a way to create co-authorship within the collective.. Among the visual, musical, and literary artiats who have participated with Plexuas are William Parker, Shalom Tomáš Neuman, Butch Morris, Stephen DiLauro, Miguel Algarin, Arturo Lindsay, and Lorenzo Pace.

In 1985, the collective held a three-hour long show, titled "The Artificial Time of the Purgatorio Show '85 New York", at a Lower East Side squat, CUANDO. The collective's later work tended toward digital art productions, and the group eventually moved to be based in Italy.

== Selected publications ==
- Dernini, Sandro (2010). Art slavery : Plexus, an illustrated art book. Roma. ISBN 9788895814346.
