= Barbara Burlingame =

Nutrition scientist

Barbara A. Burlingame
- Born: Boston, Massachusetts, USA
- Citizenship: New Zealand, United States (dual)
- Education: University of California, Davis, Massey University
- Scientific career
- Fields: nutrition
- Workplaces: Food and Agriculture Organization, Massey University
- Thesis: Food composition harmonisation in international nutrition programme management (1997)

Barbara A. Burlingame is a nutrition scientist specializing in food composition, biodiversity for food and nutrition, sustainable diets and sustainable food systems, and traditional food systems of indigenous peoples. She is involved in nutrition policy development at the global level, and is currently a professor at Massey University.

== Career ==
In 1983, Burlingame received her BSc from the University of California, Davis in Nutrition Science and Environmental Toxicology, and her PhD in 1997 from Massey University. From 1987 to 1998 she worked as a nutrition scientist and programme leader in New Zealand government science organisations. In 1998 she began working at the Food and Agriculture Organization in Rome, as senior officer, chief and deputy director of nutrition through 2015. In 2016 she returned New Zealand as a professor of nutrition and food systems in the school of public health at Massey University.

Burlingame's other roles currently include membership on the High Level Panel of Experts on Food Security and Nutrition, chair of the task force on sustainable diets for the International Union of Nutritional Sciences, and Specialty Chief Editor of Frontiers in Nutrition. Previous roles include director of the International Network of Food Data Systems (INFOODS), 1993–2011; Editor-in-Chief of the Journal of Food Composition and Analysis, 1997–2010; Panel Member, Dietetic Products, Nutrition and Allergies (NDA), European Food Safety Authority (2015-2018)

== Selected works ==
- HLPE (2020). Food Security and Nutrition: Building a Global Narrative Towards 2030. A report by the High Level Panel of Experts on Food Security and Nutrition of the Committee on World Food Security. HLPE Report 15. Rome.
- HLPE (2020). Interim Issues Paper on the Impact of COVID-19 on Food Security and Nutrition by the High Level Panel of Experts on Food Security and Nutrition (HLPE).
- Burlingame, B. (2020). Challenges and impacts of poor diets and nutrition. In Biodiversity, Food and Nutrition: A New Agenda for Sustainable Food Systems (Eds. Hunter, Borelli, & Gee). Routledge, UK.
- Burlingame, B. (2020). Sustainability. In Healthy and Sustainable Food Systems (Eds. Lawrence & Friel). Routledge, UK.
- Burlingame, B. & Dernini, S. (2019). Sustainable Diets: Linking Nutrition and Food Systems. CABI, Oxfordshire, UK.
- Berry, E.M., Dernini, S., Burlingame, B., Meybeck, A. and Conforti, P. (2015). Food security and sustainability: can one exist without the other? Public Health Nutrition, 2/2015. doi: 10.1017/S136898001500021X
- Dernini S., Meybeck A., Burlingame B., Gitz V., Lacirignola C., Debs P., Capone R., El Bilali H. (2013). Developing a methodological approach for assessing the sustainability of diets: The Mediterranean Diet as a case study. New Medit 3/2013: 28–36.
- Garnett, T., Appleby, M.C., Balmford, A.,..., Burlingame, B.,...Godfray, H.C.J. (2013). Sustainable intensification in agriculture: Premises and policies. Science, 341 (6141): 33–34.
- Kuhnlein, H., Erasmus, B., Spigelski, D., Burlingame, B. (2013). Indigenous Peoples Food and Wellbeing: Interventions and Policies for Healthy Communities. FAO and CINE, Rome.
- Burlingame, Barbara, and Sandro Dernini (Editors). "Sustainable Diets and Biodiversity: Directions and Solutions for Policy, Research and Action". [Food and Agriculture Organization of the United Nations] (FAO, Rome), 2012.
- Burlingame, Barbara, Ruth Charrondiere, and Beatrice Mouille. "Food composition is fundamental to the cross-cutting initiative on biodiversity for food and nutrition." Journal of Food Composition and Analysis 22, no. 5 (2009): 361–365.
- Burlingame, Barbara, Beatrice Mouillé, and Ruth Charrondière. "Nutrients, bioactive non-nutrients and anti-nutrients in potatoes." Journal of Food Composition and Analysis 22, no. 6 (2009): 494–502.
- Toledo, Álvaro, and Barbara Burlingame. "Biodiversity and nutrition: A common path toward global food security and sustainable development." Journal of food composition and analysis 19, no. 6 (2006): 477–483.
- Kennedy, Gina, and Barbara Burlingame. "Analysis of food composition data on rice from a plant genetic resources perspective." Food Chemistry 80, no. 4 (2003): 589–596.
