= Journal of Food Composition and Analysis =

- Discipline: Human food composition
- Language: English
- Edited by: J. Crews

Publication details
- History: 1987–present
- Publisher: Elsevier
- Frequency: 8/year
- Impact factor: 1.985 (2014)

Standard abbreviations
- ISO 4: J. Food Compos. Anal.

Indexing
- ISSN: 0889-1575
- LCCN: 88659215
- OCLC no.: 231045263

Links
- Journal homepage; Online access

The Journal of Food Composition and Analysis is a peer-reviewed scientific journal focusing on human food composition.
