= Saltiness =

Basic taste

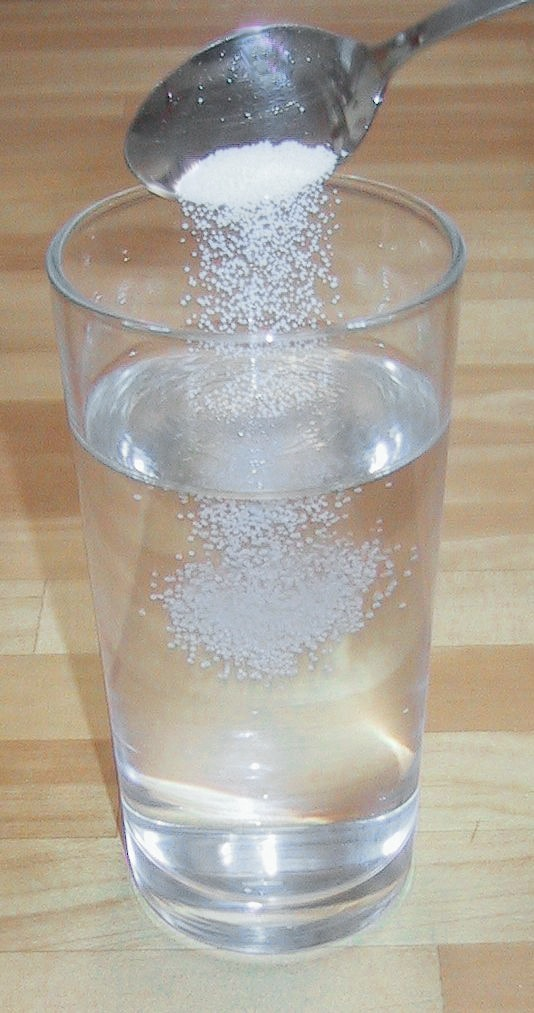

Saltiness is one of the basic tastes. It appears to have two components: a low-salt signal and a high-salt signal. The low-salt signal produces a sensation of deliciousness, while the high-salt signal typically produces a sensation of "too much salt".

The low-salt signal is understood to be mediated by the epithelial sodium channel (ENaC), which consists of three subunits. ENaC in taste cells allows sodium cations to enter the cell. This in turn depolarizes the cell and opens voltage-gated calcium channels, flooding the cell with positive calcium ions and leading to neurotransmitter release. ENaC can be blocked by the drug amiloride in many mammals, particularly rats. The sensitivity of the low-salt taste to amiloride in humans is much less pronounced, leading to speculation that there may be additional low-salt receptors besides ENaC to be discovered.

A number of similar cations also activate the low salt signal. The size of lithium and potassium ions is most similar to that of sodium, and so their saltiness is most similar. In contrast, rubidium and caesium ions are much larger, so their saltiness differs accordingly. The saltiness of substances is rated relative to sodium chloride (NaCl), which has an index of 1. Potassium, as potassium chloride (KCl), is the main ingredient in salt substitutes and has a saltiness index of 0.6.
