= Food speculation =

Financial market

Food speculation refers to the buying and selling of futures contracts or other commodity derivatives by traders with the aim of profiting from changes in food prices. Food speculation can be both positive and negative for food producers and buyers. It is betting on food prices in financial markets.

Food speculation by global players like banks, hedge funds or pension funds is alleged to cause price swings in staple foods such as wheat, maize and soy – even though too large price swings in an idealized economy are theoretically ruled out: Adam Smith in 1776 reasoned that the only way to make money from commodities trading is by buying low and selling high, which has the effect of smoothing out price swings and mitigating shortages. For the actors, the apparently random swings are predictable, which means potential huge profits. For the global poor, food speculation and resulting price peaks may result in increased poverty or even famine.

In contrast to food hoarding, speculation does not mean that real food shortages or scarcity need to be evoked, the price changes are only due to trading activity. Food speculation may be a reason for agflation. The 2007–08 world food price crisis is thought to have been be partially caused by such speculation.

== History ==
Institutions such as hedge funds, pension funds and investment banks have been accused of pushing up prices, with investment in food commodities rising from $65bn to $126bn (£41bn to £79bn) between 2007 and 2012, contributing to 30-year highs. This has caused price fluctuations which are not strongly related to the actual supply of food, according to the United Nations.

By 2010, financial institutions made up 61% of all investment in wheat futures. According to Olivier De Schutter, the UN special rapporteur on food, there was a rush by institutions to enter the food market following George W. Bush's Commodities Futures Modernization Act of 2000. De Schutter told the Independent in March 2012: "What we are seeing now is that these financial markets have developed massively with the arrival of these new financial investors, who are purely interested in the short-term monetary gain and are not really interested in the physical thing – they never actually buy the ton of wheat or maize; they only buy a promise to buy or to sell. The result of this financialization of the commodities market is that the prices of the products respond increasingly to a purely speculative logic. This explains why in very short periods of time we see prices spiking or bubbles exploding because prices are less and less determined by the real match between supply and demand." In 2011, 450 economists from around the world called on the G20 to regulate the commodities market more.

Some experts have said that speculation has merely aggravated other factors, such as climate change, competition with bio-fuels and overall rising demand. However, some such as Jayati Ghosh, professor of economics at Jawaharlal Nehru University in New Delhi, have pointed out that prices have increased irrespective of supply and demand issues: Ghosh points to world wheat prices, which doubled in the period from June to December 2010, despite there being no fall in global supply.

== See also ==
- Agflation
- Food sovereignty
- Geography of food
- Right to food
