= New York Ukulele Ensemble =

The New York Ukulele Ensemble was founded by playwright and novelist Uke Jackson. The ensemble'smMembers included: Heather Lev, Katie Down, Debra Sherline, Holly Duthie, Christina Liao, J Walter Hawkes, Greg Gattuso, Uncle Zac, and Uke Jackson. The line up was all ukulele, including soprano, concert, tenor, baritone and bass ukuleles, and banjo ukes.

The group's first CD, Ukulele Street, which included performances by additional ukulele players, was released in 2007.

Appearances by the New York Ukulele Ensemble included New York City's Art Parade and the thirty-first annual Village Halloween Costume Ball at the Theater for the New City in 2007, and the Gershwin Hotel's Living Room Series and the New York Ukulele Fest, which was founded by Uke Jackson, in 2006. The group went on a hiatus in 2008 and in 2009 Uke Jackson sold the New York Ukulele Fest to a promoter.

The New York Ukulele Ensemble performed original songs and tunes drawn from a variety of music genres. Their music is meant to present audiences with entertainment that frequently challenges cultural suppositions.
