= Agflation =

Agflation (or agrarian inflation) is an economic phenomenon of an advanced increase in the price for food and for industrial agricultural crops when compared with the general rise in prices or with the rise in prices in the non-agricultural sector. The term was increasingly used in analytical reports, for example, by the investment banks Merrill Lynch in early 2007 and Goldman Sachs in early 2008. They used the term to denote a sharp rise in prices for agricultural products, or, more precisely, a rapid increase in food prices against the background of a decrease in its reserves, a relatively low general inflation rate, and insignificant growth in the level of wages. Agflation has become an increasingly important issue for many governments. From time to time agflation may become so severe that the World Food Programme has described the phenomenon as a "silent tsunami". Agflation endangers food security, particularly for developing countries, and can cause social unrest.

== Key features ==
- Agflation can be a starting point for the general inflation.
- Agflation creates additional pressure on a household income, reducing available money for other purposes.
- It is especially dangerous both for the poor countries and for the countries that are dependent on imported food.

== Reasons ==
Several reasons may cause agflation: structural (changes in the supply-demand balance), monetary (the result of loose monetary conditions or speculations), and external (climate change, natural disasters, etc.) Among them are:

- Growing population living on the same area of arable lands. Higher demand creates an upward trend in the prices for food.
- Emergence of biofuels has substantially changed the agriculture business, creating additional demand for certain crops.
- Climate change may decrease the area of arable lands, reducing food supply.
- Rising demand from emerging markets sends food prices upward.
- Devaluing United States dollar creates upward pressure on prices.
- Violent weather phenomena (droughts, floods, hurricanes) usually result in a reduction of food supply.
- Export limitations by governments of major food exporting countries push prices for certain food items higher.
- Excessive quantitative easing has created much new capital that chases the same amount of food.
- Food speculation by big players has recently become a substantial problem.

== See also ==
- 2000s commodities boom
- 2007–2008 world food price crisis
- 2010–2012 world food price crisis
- Commodity price shocks
- Issues relating to biofuels
