= Stephen DiLauro =

Stephen DiLauro aka Uke Jackson (a nom de plume he assumed in 2000) is an American playwright, novelist, newspaper reporter, art writer, and ukulele player.

== Career ==
DiLauro has written for Smithsonian, American Artist, the Village Sun, The Fortune Society, and Cigar Aficionado. DiLauro was at one time the chief art critic for the Manhattan periodical Downtown.

As a ukulele player and afficionado, DiLauro (aka Uke Jackson) is best known for founding and leading the New York Ukulele Ensemble and for "Ukufest", at its height attended by thousands.

On March 10, 1992, a televised adaptation of DiLauro's one-act play Avenue Z Afternoon, about a Puerto Rican burglar who breaks into a Jewish matron's Brooklyn apartment, appeared on General Motors Playwrights Theater on the A&E Network; it starred Anne Meara, Lou Diamond Phillips, and Wendell Pierce. Carole Kucharwicz in Variety said: it was "All in all a productive afternoon".

In 2008, DiLauro combined his love for ukuleles with his role as a playwright, creating the book for the musical Sex Drugs and Ukuleles staged at the Theater for the New City in the East Village, Manhattan neighborhood of New York City. DiLauro's play Monster Time was listed as one of the top ten dramatic works of the year in The Burns Mantle Theater Yearbook of 1989-1990 Featuring the Ten Best Plays of the Season. New York magazine described it as a "Prison drama heightened by the setting being death row".

DiLauro is the co-author of Perillo Artist of the American West (Alpine Fine Arts Collection 1981). He is also the co-author, with Roy Moyer (ed.) and Gilbert Lascault, of the 1986 monograph Doğançay, focusing on the Turkish American artist Burhan Doğançay.

DiLauro's 1996 CD audio collection River Tales first broadcast on WBAI in New York City was covered in Newsweek, as well as other news outlets.

== Personal life ==
He is the son of Mr. and Mrs. Cornelius Ferrin DiLauro and grew up in Clinton Township, New Jersey. His father was a United Airlines pilot and real estate investor.

DiLauro was formerly married to the actress Sara Jackson, who played Dolly on the daytime television soap opera One Life to Live. This marriage and his previous one both ended in divorce.
