= List of waste management acronyms =

The following article contains a list of acronyms and initials used in the waste management industry.

== A ==
- AATF Approved Authorised Treatment Facility
- ABPO Animal By-Products Order
- ABPR Animal By-Products Regulations
- ABS Acrylonitrile Butadiene Styrene
- ACE Alliance of Beverage Cartons and the Environment
- ACL Approved Carriers List
- ACM Asbestos Containing Material
- ACoP Approved Code of Practice
- ACP Advisory Committee on Packaging
- AD Anaerobic Digestion
- ADBA Anaerobic Digestion & Biogas Association
- ADI Acceptable Daily Intake
- ADR Accord Europeen Relatif aux Transport International des Marchandises Dangereuses par Route, a European treaty concerned with the international carriage of dangerous goods by road
- AE Approved Exporter
- AfOR Association for Organics Recycling
- ALANI Association of Local Authorities in Northern Ireland
- ALARP As Low As Reasonably Practicable
- ALCO Association of London Cleansing Officers
- ANPR Automatic Number Plate Recognition
- APC Air Pollution Control
- APCR Air Pollution Control Residue
- APSRG Associate Parliamentary Sustainable Resource Group
- AR Accredited Reprocessor
- ARF Advanced Recycling Fee
- ARM Alternative Raw Material
- ASBO Anti Social Behaviour Order
- ASR Automotive Shredder Residue
- ASSURE Association for Sustainable Use and Recovery of Resources
- ATEX Atmosphères Explosives Directive 94/9/EC
- ATF Authorised Treatment Facility (e.g. for the treatment of end-of-life vehicles (see ELV) and waste electrical and electronic equipment (see WEEE))
- ATT Advanced Thermal Treatment
- AV Abandoned Vehicle/s
- AVAC Automated Vacuum Collection
- AWC Alternate Weekly Collections
- AWCS Automated Waste Collection System
- AWTT Alternative Waste Treatment Technologies
- AWP Area Waste Plan

== B ==
- BAN Basel Action Network
- BANANA Build absolutely nothing anywhere near anything
- BAT (NEEC) Best available technique (not entailing excessive costs)
- BATRRT Best Available Treatment Recycling and Recovery Technology
- BCS Batteries Compliance Scheme
- BDF Biodiesel fuel
- BFR Brominated Flame Retardant
- BIFM British Institute of Facilities Management
- BMRA British Metals Recycling Association
- BMT Biological Mechanical Treatment
- BMW Biodegradable Municipal Waste
- BOD Biological Oxygen Demand
- BOO Build Own Operate
- BOT Build Operate Transfer
- BPEO Best Practicable Environmental Option
- BPF British Plastics Federation
- BPPO Best Practicable Planning Option
- BRBA Buy Recycled Business Alliance (Australia)
- BREEAM Building Research Establishment Environmental Assessment Method
- BREF BAT Reference Note
- BREW(p) Business Resource Efficiency and Waste programme
- BRITE Better Regulation in the Environment (Environment Agency initiative)
- BRE Building Research Establishment
- BSI British Standards Institute
  - BSI PAS 100 Specification for composted materials
  - BSI PAS 101 Recovered container glass: Specification for quality and guidance for good practice in collection
  - BSI PAS 102 Specification for processed glass for selected secondary end markets
  - BSI PAS 103 Collected waste plastics packaging: Specification for quality and guidance for good practice in collection and preparation for recycling
  - BSI PAS 104 Wood recycling in the panelboard manufacturing industry: Specification for quality and guidance for good practice for the supply of post consumer wood for consumption in the manufacture of panelboard products
  - BSI PAS 105 Recovered paper sourcing and quality for UK end markets
  - BSI PAS 107 Specification for the manufacture and storage of size reduced tyre materials
  - BSI PAS 108 Specification for the production of tyre bales for use in construction
  - BSI PAS 109 Specification for the production of recycled gypsum from waste plasterboard
  - BSI PAS 110 Specification for whole digestate, separated liquor and separated fibre derived from the anaerobic digestion of source-segregated biodegradable materials
  - BSI PAS 111 Specification for the requirements and test methods for processing waste wood
  - BSI PAS 141 Reuse of used and waste electrical and electronic equipment (UEEE and WEEE). Process management - Specification
- BVPI Best Value Performance Indicator
- BVPP Best Value Performance Plan

== C ==
- CA Civic amenity site
- CAFÉ Clean Air For Europe programme
- CATNAP Cheapest Available Technology Narrowly Avoiding Prosecution
- CATNIP Cheapest Available Technology Not Involving Prosecution
- CAVE Citizens against virtually everything
- CBI Confederation of British Industry
- CBM Compressed Biomethane
- CCGT Combined cycle gas turbine
- CCHP Combined cooling, heating and power
- CCL Climate Change Levy
- CCT Compulsory Competitive Tendering
- C&D Construction and demolition (e.g. C&D waste)
- CDG(CPL) Carriage of Dangerous Goods by Road and Rail (Classification, Packaging and Labelling) Regulations 1994
- CEC Commission of the European Communities
- CEMP Construction Environmental Management Plan
- CEN Comite Europeen de Normalisation (European Committee for Standardization)
- CEWEP Confederation of European Waste-to-Energy Plants
- CFC Chlorofluorocarbon
- CfSH Code for Sustainable Homes
- CHEM Container Handling Equipment Manufacturers
- CHIP Chemicals (Hazard Information and Packaging for Supply) Regulations
- CHP Combined heat and power
- CHPA Combined Heat and Power Association
- C&I Commercial and industrial (e.g. C&I waste)
- CIPFA Chartered Institute of Public Finance and Accountancy
- CIWEM Chartered Institution of Water and Environmental Management
- CIWM Chartered Institution of Wastes Management
- CIWMB California Integrated Waste Management Board
- CL:AIRE Contaminated Land: Application In Real Environments CLAIRE
- CLEA Contaminated Land Exposure Assessment
- CLO Compost-like output
- CLR Contaminated Land Register
- CNEA Clean Neighbourhoods and Environment Act
- COD Chemical oxygen demand or certificate of destruction
- COMAH Control of Major Accident Hazards
- COPA Control of Pollution Act
- COPLR Code of Practice for Litter and Refuse
- CoRWM Committee on Radioactive Waste Management
- COSHH Control of Substances Hazardous to Health
- CoTC Certificate of Technical Competence
- CPA Comprehensive Performance Assessment
- CRC CRC Energy Efficiency Scheme (formerly the Carbon Reduction Commitment)
- CRC Community recycling centre
- CRN Community Recycling Network
- CRNS Community Recycling Network for Scotland
- CRR Campaign for Real Recycling
- CRT Cathode-ray tube
- CSER Corporate, social and environmental responsibilities
- CSR Corporate social responsibility
- CSTR Continuous stirred-tank reactor
- CV Calorific value
- CWMRE Creating Welsh Markets for Recyclates
- CWP Cheshire Waste Partnership
- CWR Controlled Waste Regulations

== D ==
- DAC Dense Asphaltic Concrete
- DBFO Design Build Finance and Operate
- DCF Designated Collection Facility
- DCLG Department for Communities and Local Government
- DECC Department of Energy and Climate Change
- DECLG Department of the Environment, Community and Local Government (Ireland)
- DEFRA Department for Environment, Food and Rural Affairs
- DGXI Directorate General of the European Commission responsible for the Environment
- DLGE Department of Local Government and the Environment (Isle of Man)
- DMR Dry Mixed Recyclables
- DoC Duty of Care
- DOENI Department for the Environment (Northern Ireland)
- DRI Dynamic Respiration Index
- DSD Duales System Deutschland
- DSO Direct Service Organisation
- DTI Department of Trade and Industry
- DTLR Department for Transport, Local Government and the Regions
- DTS Distributor Takeback Scheme
- DWP Dorset Waste Partnership

== E ==
- EA Enforcement Agency
- EBRA European Battery Recycling Association
- ECN European Compost Network
- EDIE Environmental Data Interactive Exchange
- eDoC Electronic Duty of Care
- EEA European Environment Agency
- EfW Energy-from-Waste
- EGSB Expanded Granular Sludge Bed
- EHO Environmental health officer
- EHS Environment & Heritage Service (Northern Ireland)
- EIA Environmental Impact Assessment
- EIC Environmental Industries Commission
- EIR Environmental Information Regulations
- ELSEF East London Sustainable Energy Facility
- ELV End of Life Vehicles
- ELWA East London Waste Authority
- EMAS Eco-Management and Audit Scheme
- EMS Environmental Management System
- ENTRUST The European Trust Scheme Regulatory Body
- ENCAMS Environmental Campaigns (umbrella name for former Going for Green and Tidy Britain Group)
- EP Environmental Permit
- EPA Environmental Protection Act or Environmental Protection Agency
- EPERN Electronic Packaging Waste Export Recovery Notes
- EPOW European Pathway to Zero Waste
- EPR Environmental Permitting Regulations
- EPRN Electronic Packaging Waste Recovery Notes
- EPS Expanded Polystyrene
- ERFO European Recovered Fuels Organisation
- ERI Energy Recovery Incineration
- ES Environmental Statement
- ESA Environmental Services Association
- ESWET European Suppliers of Waste-to-Energy Technology
- ETBC Electronics TakeBack Coalition
- ETRMA European Tyre & Rubber Manufacturers' Association
- ETS Emissions Trading Scheme
- ETSU Energy Technology Support Unit
- EUHWL EU Hazardous Waste List (now incorporated into EWC)
- EUROPEN European Organization for Packaging and the Environment
- EWC European Waste Catalogue
- EWP Essex Waste Partnership

== F ==
- FABRA Foodchain & Biomass Renewables Association
- FAPP Fit And Proper Person
- FBA Furnace Bottom Ash
- FCC Fomento de Construcciones y Contratas
- FEAD Fédération Européenne des Activités du Déchet et de l’Environnement European Federation of Waste Management and Environmental Services
- FEL Front End Loader
- FGT Flue Gas Treatment
- FOE Friends of the Earth
- FORWARRD Forum for Waste and Resource Research and Development
- FPN Fixed Penalty Notice
- Frag Fragmentised Waste (e.g. from the vehicle recycling industry)
- FTE Full-time equivalent
- FWD Food Waste Disposer

== G ==
- GAIA Global Alliance for Incinerator Alternatives
- GCV Gross Calorific Value
- GHG Greenhouse Gas
- GIB Green Investment Bank
- GIS Geographical Information System
- GLA Greater London Authority
- GMWDA Greater Manchester Waste Disposal Authority
- GWP Global Warming Potential

== H ==
- HCRW Healthcare Risk Waste
- HCW Healthcare Waste
- HDPE High Density Polyethylene
- HFC Hydrofluorocarbon
- HHW Household Hazardous Waste
- HIPS High Impact Polystyrene
- HLW High Level Waste
- HSC Health and Safety Commission
- HSE Health & Safety Executive
- HTI High Temperature Incineration
- HW Household waste
- HWOL HazWasteOnline (web-based tool for assessing and classifying hazardous waste)
- HWR Hazardous Waste Regulations
- HWRA Household Waste Recycling Act
- HWRC Household Waste Recycling Centre

== I ==
- IBA Incinerator Bottom Ash
- IBAA Incinerator Bottom Ash Aggregate
- ICE Institution of Civil Engineers
- ICER Industry Council for Electronic Equipment Recycling
- ICW International Catering Waste (catering waste from means of transport operating internationally)
- IED Industrial Emissions Directive
- ILW Intermediate Level Waste
- INCPEN Industry Council for Packaging and the Environment
- IPP Integrated Product Policy
- IPPC Integrated Pollution Prevention and Control
- ISRI Institute of Scrap Recycling Industries
- ISWA International Solid Waste Association
- IVC In-vessel Composting
- IWM Integrated Waste Management or Institute of Wastes Management

== J ==
- JMWMS Joint Municipal Waste Management Strategy
- JWA Joint Waste Authority

== K ==
- KAT Kerbside Assessment Tool

== L ==
- LA Local Authority
- LAAPC Local Authority Air Pollution Control
- LACMW Local Authority Collected Municipal Waste (household and commercial waste where collected by the local authority and which is similar in nature and composition as required by the Landfill Directive)
- LACW Local Authority Collected Waste (all waste collected by the local authority. This is a slightly broader concept than LACMW as it would include both this and non-municipal fractions such as construction and demolition waste)
- LAPC Local Air Pollution Control
- LARAC Local Authority Recycling Advisory Committee
- LAS Landfill Allowance Scheme
- LASU Local Authority Support Unit
- LATS Landfill Allowance Trading Scheme
- LAWAS Local Authority Waste Arisings Survey
- LAWDC Local Authority Waste Disposal Company
- LCA Life Cycle Analysis/Assessment
- LCF Landfill Communities Fund
- LCW Low Carbon Waste
- LCPD Large Combustion Plant Directive
- LDPE Low Density Polyethylene
- LEA Local Enforcement Agency
- LEL Lower Explosive Limit
- LFD Landfill Directive
- LFG Landfill Gas
- LFT Landfill Tax
- LGA Local Government Association
- LHIP Landfill and Hazardous Waste Implementation Programme
- LIM Loose Incinerator Metals
- LLDPE Linear Low Density Polyethylene e.g. plastic wrap and stretch wrap
- LLW Low Level Waste
- LOLER Lifting Operations and Lifting Equipment Regulations 1998
- LOW List of Wastes
- LPSA Local Public Service Agreement
- LTCS Landfill Tax Credit Scheme
- LWaRB London Waste and Recycling Board

== M ==
- MTD Metric Ton per Day
- MAC Maximum Allowable Concentration
- MBI Mass Burn Incineration
- MBT Mechanical Biological Treatment
- MCA Municipal Collection Authority
- MCERTS Monitoring Certification Scheme
- MCDA Multi Criteria Decision Analysis
- MDC Metropolitan District Council
- MDR Mixed Dry Recyclables
- MEL Maximum Exposure Limit
- MHSWR Management of Health & Safety at Work Regulations
- MHT Mechanical Heat Treatment
- MMRCV Multi-Modal Refuse Collection Vehicle
- MREC Materials Recovery and Energy Centre
- MRF Materials Recovery Facility (or Recycling or Factory)
- MRWA Merseyside Recycling and Waste Authority formerly known as Merseyside Waste Disposal Authority
- MSW Municipal Solid Waste
- MSWI Municipal Solid Waste Incineration
- MVDA Motor Vehicle Dismantlers Association
- MWDA Merseyside Waste Disposal Authority as of December 2011 renamed as Merseyside Recycling and Waste Authority
- MWLP Minerals and Waste Local Plan
- MWMS Municipal Waste Management Strategy

== N ==
- NAWDO National Association of Waste Disposal Officers
- NCAS National Compliance Assessment Service
- NCH National Clearing House
- NCV Net calorific value
- NELVS Natural End of Life Vehicles
- NFFO Non-Fossil Fuel Obligation
- NGG New Generation Group (CIWM programme renamed New Member Network)
- NGO Non-Governmental Organisation
- NHHWF National Household Hazardous Waste Forum
- NIEA Northern Ireland Environment Agency
- NIMBY Not In My Back-Yard
- NISP National Industrial Symbiosis Programme
- NLWA North London Waste Authority
- NOF New Opportunities Fund
- NPWD National Packaging Waste Database
- NRC Nuclear Regulatory Commission (US)
- NSIP Nationally significant infrastructure project
- NVQ National Vocational Qualification
- NWCPO: National Waste Collection Permit Office (in Ireland)
- NWMRF National Waste Minimisation & Recycling Fund
- NWP National Waste Plan or Norfolk Waste Partnership
- NWPA Nuclear Waste Policy Act
- NEST Nigerian Environmental Study Action Team

== O ==
- OBB Old Boxboard
- OCC Old Corrugated Containers
- ODPM Office of the Deputy Prime Minister
- ODS Ozone Depleting Substance
- OECD Organisation for Economic Co-operation and Development
- OFGEM Office of Gas and Electricity Markets (Great Britain)
- OFWAT Office of Water Services (England and Wales)
- OJEU Official Journal of the European Union
- OMA Operator Monitoring Assessment
- OPRA Operator Pollution Risk Appraisal
- ORA Oil Recycling Association
- OWP Oxfordshire Waste Partnership

== P ==
- PAFA Packaging and Films Association
- pams Periodicals and Magazines
- PAS Publicly Available Specification
- PAYT Pay As You Throw
- PCB Polychlorinated Biphenyl
- PCS Producer Compliance Scheme
- PELVs Premature End of Life Vehicles (relatively new cars which have not survived the expected life span that most vehicle manufacturers build into their vehicles)
- PERN Packaging Export Recovery Note
- PET Polyethylene Terephthalate
- PFI Private Finance Initiative
- PIU Performance and Innovation Unit
- PM Particulate Matter, airborne (e.g. PM 10 ~ particles under 10 micrometres)
- PP Polypropylene
- PP Proximity Principle
- PPC Pollution Prevention and Control Act
- PPE Personal Protective Equipment
- PPG Planning Policy Guidance Notes (e.g. PPG 10 for waste management)
- PPP Public Private Partnership or Polluter-pays principle
- PPS Planning Policy Statement
- PR Producer Responsibility
- PRF Plastics Reclamation Facility
- PRN Packaging Recovery Note
- PS Polystyrene
- PSA Public Service Agreement
- PUWER Provision and Use of Work Equipment Regulations
- PVB Polyvinyl Butyral
- PVC Polyvinyl Chloride

== Q ==
- QMS Quality Management System
- QP Quality Protocol
- QUANGO Quasi Autonomous Non-Governmental Organisation
- QESH Quality, Environment, Safety and Health
- QUENSH QUality, ENvironment, Safety and Health

== R ==
- 3Rs Reduce, Reuse, Recycle
- RAD Rotary Aerobic Digestion
- RAG Recycling Advisory Group, Scotland
- RCE Regional Centre of Excellence
- RCEP Royal Commission on Environmental Pollution
- RCRA Resource Conservation and Recovery Act (US)
- RCV Refuse Collection Vehicle
- RDA Regional Development Agency (all abolished in England on 31 March 2012)
- RDF Refuse Derived Fuel
- REACH Registration, Evaluation, Authorisation and Restriction of Chemicals
- RECAP Recycling in Cambridgeshire and Peterborough
- RECOUP Recycling Of Used Plastics
- REL Rear End Loader
- REMADE Recycled Market Development
- REPAC Regional Environmental Protection Advisory Committee
- RFID Radio Frequency Identification
- RIA Regulatory Impact Assessment
- RID Regulations concerning the International Carriage of Dangerous Goods by Rail
- RIDDOR Reporting of Injuries, Diseases and Dangerous Occurrences Regulations 1995
- RGN Regulatory Guidance Note
- RMA U.S. Rubber Manufacturers Association
- RO Renewables Obligation
- ROC Renewables Obligation Certificates
- RoHS Restriction of Hazardous Substances
- RoRo Rolonof/Roll-on Roll-off, demountable container system
- ROTATE Recycling and Organic Technology Advisory Team
- RSA Recycled & Secondary Aggregate
- RSA Restoring Sustainable Abstraction
- RTAB Regional Technical Advisory Body
- RVM Reverse Vending Machine
- RWM Recycling and Waste Management Exhibition
- RWMO Radioactive Waste Management Organisation

== S ==
- SEA Strategic Environmental Assessment
- SEI Sustainable Electronics Initiative
- SELCHP South East London Combined Heat and Power
- SEPA Scottish Environment Protection Agency
- SGV Soil Guideline Value
- SIG Special Interest Group of CIWM
- SLF Secondary Liquid Fuel
- SLWP South London Waste Partnership
- SMDSA Sanitary Medical Disposal Services Association
- SNIFFER Scotland and Northern Ireland Forum for Environmental Research
- SNRHW Stable Non-Reactive Hazardous Wastes
- SocEnv Society for the Environment
- SRB Single Regeneration Budget
- SRF Secondary Recovered Fuel or Solid or Specified
- SSWAT Site Specific Waste Analysis Tool
- STA Source Testing Association
- SWA Solid Waste Analysis
- SWAG Scottish Waste Advisory Group
- SWCN Special Waste Consignment Note
- SWDF Solid Waste Disposal Facilities
- SWDWP South West Devon Waste Partnership
- SWEN Special Waste Explanatory Note
- SWF Strategic Waste Fund (Scotland)
- SWM Sustainable Waste Management
- SWMA Strategic Waste Management Assessment
- SWP Shropshire Waste Partnership or Somerset Waste Partnership or Surrey Waste Partnership

== T ==
- TAC Technical Adaptation Committee
- TAD Thermophilic Aerobic Digestion
- TCLP Toxicity Characteristic Leaching Procedure
- TAN Technical Advice Note (Wales)
- TEEP Technically, Environmentally and Economically Practicable
- TEF Toxic Equivalent Factor
- TFS Transfrontier Shipment
- THP Thermal hydrolysis
- TLS Transfer Loading Station
- tpa tonnes per annum
- TRACS Tyre Recovery Activity Compliance Scheme (Ireland)
- TRAID Textile Recycling for Aid and International Development
- TRF Thermal Recovery Facility
- TRIF Technology and Research Innovation Fund
- TT Thermal Treatment
- TUPE Transfer of Undertakings (Protection of Employment)

== U ==
- UA Unitary Authority
- UASB Upflow anaerobic sludge blanket digestion
- UBC Used Beverage Can
- UDP Unitary Development Plan
- UEL Upper Explosive Limit
- UEEE Used Electrical and Electronic Equipment
- UKELA UK Environmental Law Association
- UKWIN United Kingdom Without Incineration
- UNEP United Nations Environment Programme
- UROC United Resource Operators Confederation

== V ==
- VCU Vertical Composting Units
- VLLW Very Low Level Waste
- VOC Volatile Organic Compound
- VRQ Vocationally Related Qualification

== W ==
- WAC Waste Acceptance Criteria
- WAG Welsh Assembly Government
- WAMITAB Waste Management Industry Training & Advisory Board
- WARRAG Waste And Resources Research Advisory Group
- WCA Waste Collection Authority
- WDA Waste Disposal Authority
- WDF WasteDataFlow (web-based system for municipal waste data reporting by UK local authorities)
- WEEE Waste Electrical and Electronic Equipment
- WET Waste and Emissions Trading Act 2003
- WFD Waste Framework Directive
- WID Waste Incineration Directive
- WIP Waste Implementation Programme
- WIPP Waste Isolation Pilot Plant
- WISARD Waste Integrated Systems Assessment for Recovery and Disposal
- WLP Waste Local Plan
- WLWA West London Waste Authority
- WM2 Technical Guidance WM2 Hazardous Waste: Interpretation of the definition and classification of hazardous waste
- WMF Waste Management Facility
- WML Waste Management Licence (replaced by Environmental Permits)
- WMP Waste Management Plan
- WMPEG Waste Minimisation Performance and Efficiency Grant
- WMS Waste Management Strategy
- WRAP Waste and Resources Action Programme
- WRATE Waste and Resources Assessment Tool for the Environment
- WRG Waste Recycling Group
- WRWA Western Riverside Waste Authority
- WS2007 Waste Strategy for England 2007 (superseded by the Waste Management Plan for England (2013))
- WSA Waste Strategy Area (e.g. 11 WSAs in Scotland)
- WtE Waste-to-Energy
- WTF Waste Transfer Facility
- WTN Waste Transfer Note

== X ==
- XRF X-Ray Fluorescence (i.e. checking for the presence of metals in waste plastics)

== Y ==
- YNYWMP York and North Yorkshire Waste Management Partnership

== Z ==
- ZWS Zero Waste Scotland

== See also ==
- Chartered Institution of Wastes Management
- List of waste management concepts
