= Index of waste management articles =

Articles related to waste management include:

== A ==
- Advanced Thermal Treatment
- Air Pollution Control
- Alternate Weekly Collections
- Animal By-Products Order
- Animal By-Products Regulations
- Anaerobic digestion
- Anaerobic Digestion & Biogas Association
- Approved Code of Practice
- As Low As Reasonably Practicable
- Asbestos Containing Material
- Associate Parliamentary Sustainable Resource Group
- Autoclave
- Automated Vacuum Collection
- Automotive Shredder Residue

== B ==
- Best management practice for water pollution (BMP)
- Bioaccumulation
- Biodegradability prediction
- Biodegradation
- Biodrying
- Biogas
- Biogas powerplant
- Biomedical waste

== C ==
- Carbon management
- Charity shop
- Chartered Institution of Wastes Management
- Composting
- Cruise ship
- Community service

== D ==
- Dry cleaning

== E ==
- Electronic waste

== F ==
- Fecal sludge management
- Fomento de Construcciones y Contratas
- Furnace Bottom Ash

== G ==
- Gasification
- Geographical Information System
- Global Alliance for Incinerator Alternatives
- Global warming
- Global Warming Potential
- Greater Manchester Waste Disposal Authority
- Green Investment Bank
- Greenhouse Gas

== H ==
- Health & Safety Executive
- Healthcare Waste
- High Density Polyethylene
- High Impact Polystyrene
- High Level Waste
- High Temperature Incineration
- Household hazardous waste
- Household Waste Recycling Centre
- Hydrofluorocarbon

== I ==
- ICE demolition protocol
- Incinerator Bottom Ash
- Industrial Emissions Directive
- Industrial waste
- Industrial wastewater treatment
- Industrialisation
- Integrated Product Policy
- Integrated Waste Management
- Intermediate Level Waste
- International Solid Waste Association
- In-vessel composting

== K ==
- Kerbside collection

== L ==
- Landfill
- List of solid waste treatment technologies
- List of waste water treatment technologies
- Litter

== M ==
- Materials recovery facility
- Mechanical biological treatment
- Mechanical heat treatment
- Medical waste
- Mobile incinerator
- Municipal solid waste

== N ==
- Nationally significant infrastructure project
- North London Waste Authority
- Not In My Back-Yard
- Nuclear Waste Policy Act

== O ==
- Office of the Deputy Prime Minister
- Official Journal of the European Union
- Old Corrugated Containers
- Ozone Depleting Substance

== P ==
- Packaging and labelling
- Paperless office
- Pay as you throw
- Pneumatic refuse conveying system
- Pollution
- Post-consumer waste
- Priority product
- Pyrolysis

== Q ==
- Quality Protocol
- Quasi Autonomous Non-Governmental Organisation

== R ==
- Radioactive waste
- Reduction
- Recycling
- Reuse

== S ==
- Scottish Environment Protection Agency
- Secondary Recovered Fuel
- Sewage
- Sewage collection and disposal
- Sewage treatment
- Single-stream recycling
- South East London Combined Heat and Power
- South London Waste Partnership
- Space debris
- Stable Non-Reactive Hazardous Wastes
- Sustainable Waste Management

== T ==
- Thermal Recovery Facility
- Thermophilic Aerobic Digestion
- Transfer Loading Station
- Transfer of Undertakings (Protection of Employment)
- Tunnel composting

== U ==
- Unitary Authority
- Upflow anaerobic sludge blanket digestion
- Used Beverage Can

== V ==
- Vertical Composting Units

== W ==
- Waste
- Waste collection
- Waste management
- Waste minimisation
- Water Environment Federation
- Water pollution
- Windrow composting

== X ==
- X-Ray Fluorescence

== Z ==
- Zero Waste

== See also ==
- List of environment topics
- List of waste management acronyms
- List of waste treatment technologies
- List of waste water treatment technologies
