= WCA =

WCA may refer to:

== Schools ==
- Warner Christian Academy, private Christian school in South Daytona, Florida
- Waterbury Career Academy, public high school in Waterbury, Connecticut
- Wake Christian Academy, private Christian school in Raleigh, North Carolina
- Washington Christian Academy, private Christian school in Silver Spring, Maryland
- Wesleyan Christian Academy, private school in High Point, North Carolina
- West Central Area Schools, school district in west central Minnesota
- Westminster Christian Academy (Georgia), private school in Watkinsville, Georgia
- Westminster Christian Academy (Missouri), private school in Town and Country, Missouri
- Wildwood Catholic Academy, private school in North Wildwood, New Jersey
- Williamsburg Christian Academy, private boarding school in Williamsburg, New Jersey
- Willow Creek Academy, defunct charter school in Sausalito, California
- Wisconsin Career Academy, preparatory middle and high school in Milwaukee, Wisconsin

== Governing and political bodies ==
- Waste collection authority, local authority charged with collecting waste in the United Kingdom
- Welsh Canoeing Association, governing body for canoeing and kayaking in Wales
- Welsh Cricket Association, governing body for cricket in Wales
- Women's Cricket Association, former governing body for women's cricket in England
- Women's Cricket Association of India, former governing body from 1973 to 2007
- Working Class Action, left-wing campaign group in Dublin, Ireland
- World Clown Association, governing worldwide clowning
- World Cube Association, governing Rubik's Cube competitions
- World Council of Arameans, governing the Arameans worldwide
- World Programme for the Census of Agriculture, first developed by the United Nations in 1930
- Wrangell Cooperative Association, federally recognized Native American tribe in Alaska

== Professional associations ==
- World Chiropractic Alliance, agency which involves itself in chiropractic matters

== Technical ==
- Waste collection authority, local authority in the UK charged with collection of municipal waste
- Water cascade analysis
- Water Conservation Area 3, lying north of Everglades National Park
- Weakly coordinating anion, or non-coordinating anion
- Worst-case circuit analysis
- WAGR WCA/WCE class

== Airlines ==
- WestAir Commuter Airlines, defunct United States airline from the 1970s to the 90s
- Western Canada Airways Ltd., a defunct Canadian airline of the 1920s and 1930s
- West Caribbean Airways, a Colombian airline
- West Coast Airlines, a defunct United States airline
- Wilmington-Catalina Airline, defunct airline of the 1930s and 40s

== Other ==
- Waste Corporation of America, former American waste management company that was acquired by GFL Environmental in 2020
- W C A Boarding House, historic boarding house in Springfield, Massachusetts
- WCA National Division One of the Women's Camanachd Association
- WeChoice Awards, Vietnamese awards ceremony
- Wesleyan Covenant Association, an organization associated with the Global Methodist Church
- Wikimedia Chapters Association, an organization that coordinates works of all Wikimedia chapters
- Windermere Cruising Association, sailing club located at Lake Windermere in England
- Women's Caucus for Art, New York based non-profit supporting women artists
- Women's Caucus for Art Lifetime Achievement Award, awards ceremony
- Work Capability Assessment, an approach to judging an unemployed person's suitability for work, England, present.
- World Coal Association, previously known as World Coal Institute
- World Communication Awards, awards ceremony to recognize global telecom operators
- World Constituent Assembly, 1968 meeting of world delegates
- World Counter-terrorism Agency, a fictional organization appearing in Marvel Comics
- Wyoming Contractors Association, nonprofit trade organization based in Wyoming
