= IPPC =

IPPC can mean:

- International Plant Protection Convention
- Integrated Pollution Prevention and Control
