= Best Available Techniques Reference Document =

EU information standard

Best Available Techniques Reference Documents (BREFs) are reference reports developed in the European Union to describe industrial processes, emission and consumption levels of applied techniques, and best available techniques for integrated prevention and control of pollution from industrial activities.

== Background ==
BREFs are drawn up through an exchange information between industry, non-government organizations (NGOs) promoting environmental protection, Member States of the European Union, and the European Commission following Article 13(1) of the Industrial Emissions Directive 2010/75/EU. The European Commission organises and coordinates the information exchange through the European Integrated Pollution Prevention and Control Bureau (EIPPCB), which is part of Directorate-General Joint Research Centre. The EIPPCB is located in Seville, Spain. The information exchange, including the steps for drawing up BREFs, is codified into law by Commission Implementing Decision 2012/119/EU and commonly referred to as Sevilla process.

Most BREFs cover one or several agro-industrial activities listed in Annex I of the Industrial Emissions Directive 2010/75/EU. Such BREFs are referred to as 'sectoral BREFs'. There are also 'horizontal BREFs' on cross-cutting issues such as energy efficiency, industrial cooling systems, emissions from storage, or monitoring of emissions to air and water.

BREFs established under the Industrial Emissions Directive 2010/75/EU contain a chapter on 'BAT conclusions'. This chapter is adopted as stand-alone document through Comitology and is published as EU implementing decision in the Official Journal of the European Union. 'BAT conclusions' are to be considered by Member States of the European Union as reference when setting permit conditions for all installations within the scope of the Industrial Emissions Directive.

== Definitions ==
Best Available Techniques (BAT) Reference Document (BREF) is defined in Article 3(11) of the Industrial Emissions Directive 2010/75/EU as: "[...] a document, resulting from the exchange of information organised pursuant to Article 13, drawn up for defined activities and describing, in particular, applied techniques, present emissions and consumption levels, techniques considered for the determination of best available techniques as well as BAT conclusions and any emerging techniques, giving special consideration to the criteria listed in Annex III".

BAT conclusions are defined in Article 3(12) of the Industrial Emissions Directive 2010/75/EU as: "[...] a document containing the parts of a BAT reference document laying down the conclusions on best available techniques, their description, information to assess their applicability, the emission levels associated with the best available techniques, associated monitoring, associated consumption levels and, where appropriate, relevant site remediation measures".

According to Commission Implementing Decision 2012/119/EU, a BREF contains the following parts:

- Preface
- Scope
- General information about the sector concerned
- Applied processes and techniques
- Current emission and consumption levels
- Techniques to consider in the determination of BAT
- Best available techniques (BAT) conclusions
- Emerging techniques
- Concluding remarks and recommendations for future work
- References
- Glossary of terms and abbreviations
- Annexes

== BREF repository ==
All published BREFs are available on the webpage of the European Integrated Pollution Prevention and Control Bureau.
