= Landfill diversion =

Waste diversion or landfill diversion is the process of diverting waste from landfills. The success of landfill diversion can be measured by comparison of the size of the landfill from one year to the next. If the landfill grows minimally or remains the same, then policies covering landfill diversion are successful. For example, currently in the United States there are 3000 landfills. A measure of the success of landfill diversion would be if that number remains the same or is reduced. In 2015 it was recorded that the national average of landfill diversion in the United States was 33.8%, while San Francisco had implemented the most effective policies and had recorded a landfill diversion rate of 77%.

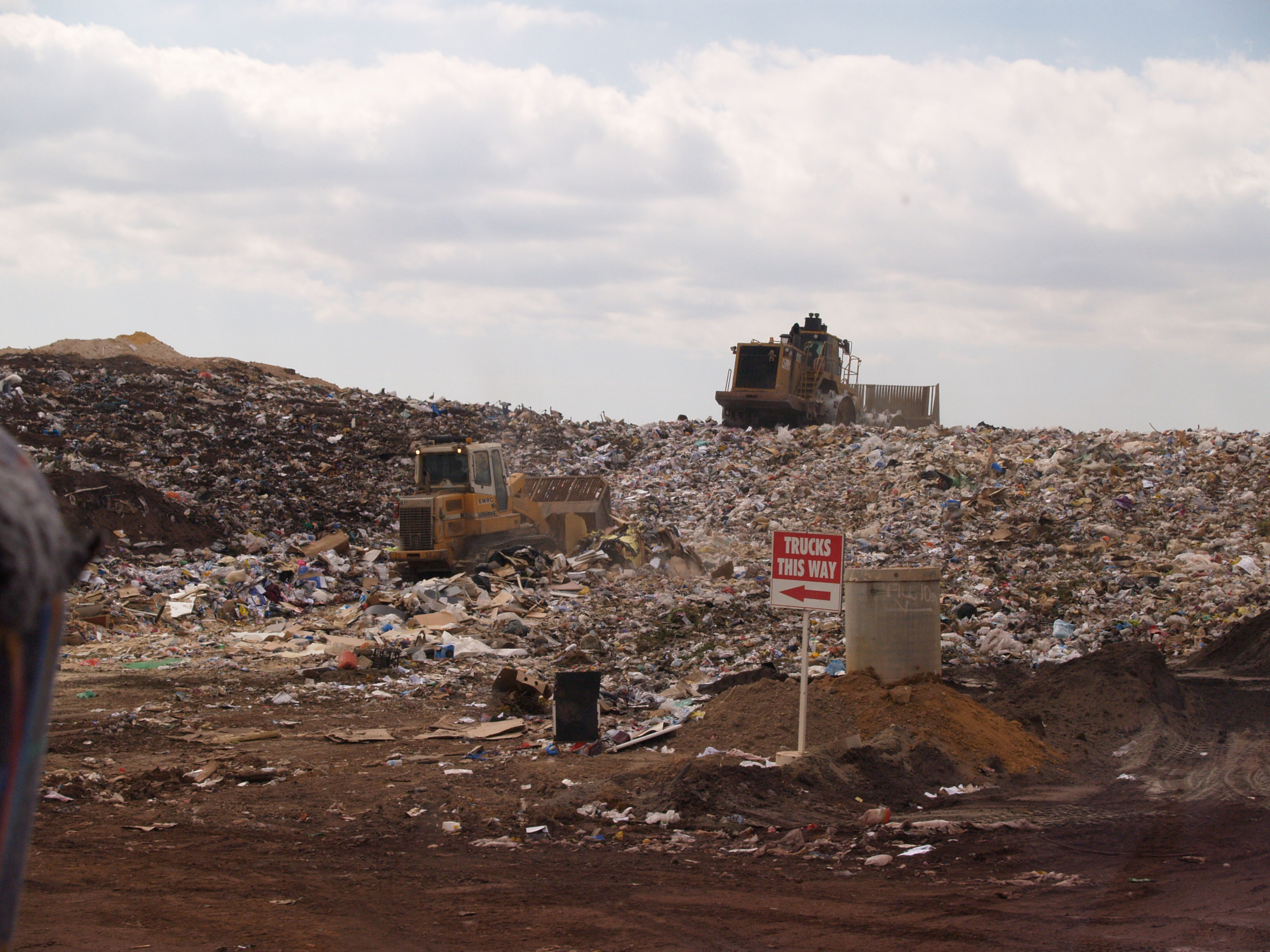
A landfill operation in Perth, Western Australia.

== Waste diversion ==
Waste diversion is the process of diverting waste from landfills through recycling and source reduction activities. This can be calculated in different ways, such as measuring the size and number of landfills from one year to the next.

== Types of landfill diversion ==
=== Waste reduction ===
Reduction of waste is another way to divert waste from landfills; not creating waste in the first place will reduce the amount of waste going to landfills. There are numerous ways to reduce waste, for example, consumers can avoid single use products and instead invest in re-usable items such as canvas bags instead of plastic bags; consuming less in general is also an effective way to reduce waste. In addition, maintaining vehicles' tires will also help reduce waste tires in landfills since they are undesirable and take up too much space along with many other negative effects.

=== Recycling ===
Landfill diversion can occur through recycling. Recycling refers to taking used materials and creating new products in order to prevent the disposal of these products in landfills. Recycling material can include glass, paper, metal, plastic, textiles, and electronics.

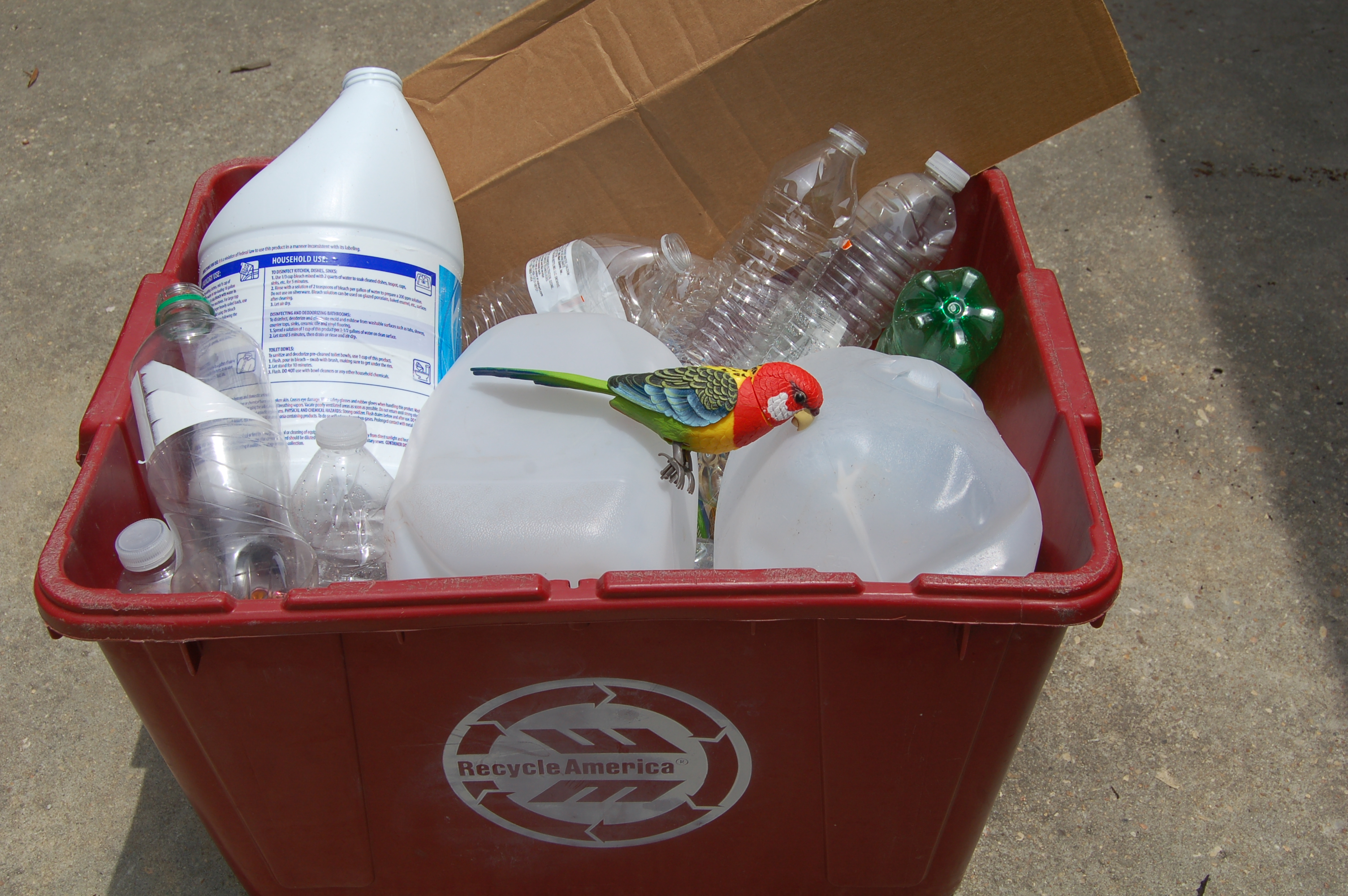
Recycle Plastic Bird

=== Thermal treatment ===
Another method of landfill diversion is thermal treatment (such as Incineration). Approximately sixteen percent (16%) of waste is incinerated yearly in the United States. Incineration, however, can lead to other environmental issues that may have positive or negative results.

=== Biological treatments ===
In addition to reusing materials waste products can go through biological treatment. There are two types of biological treatments anaerobic digestion or composting. Simply stated, biological treatment is the breaking down of material through the action of micro-organisms. Materials are broken down to carbon dioxide, water and biomass. Biomass consists of wood, crops, yard and animal waste. Biomass is considered a renewable energy because more can be grown in a short amount of time. Biomass contributes to roughly four percent of our energy. Biomass energy although its burned, does not pollute the air as much as fossil fuels. Some materials easily break down, others do not. The environment in which the material is placed determines the speed of breakdown.

=== Return waste to supplier of original materials ===
It is possible in many production facilities to return waste product to the supplier of the original raw material. Some examples include the reuse of beer kegs by returning to the distributor to be refilled, reuse of propane tanks, and recycling batteries to be used again. These products are large contributors to the overgrowth of landfills. Many companies will offer incentives or credits for the returned product towards the next purchase.

=== Reuse waste in the same or other steps of production process ===
The development of more closed loop systems aides in diverting waste from landfills. Manufacturing and most production facilities will create waste to varying degrees. A closed loop system will recycle the waste back into the production process to maintain minimal levels of waste that is left to be disposed of. This is environmentally and economically friendly.

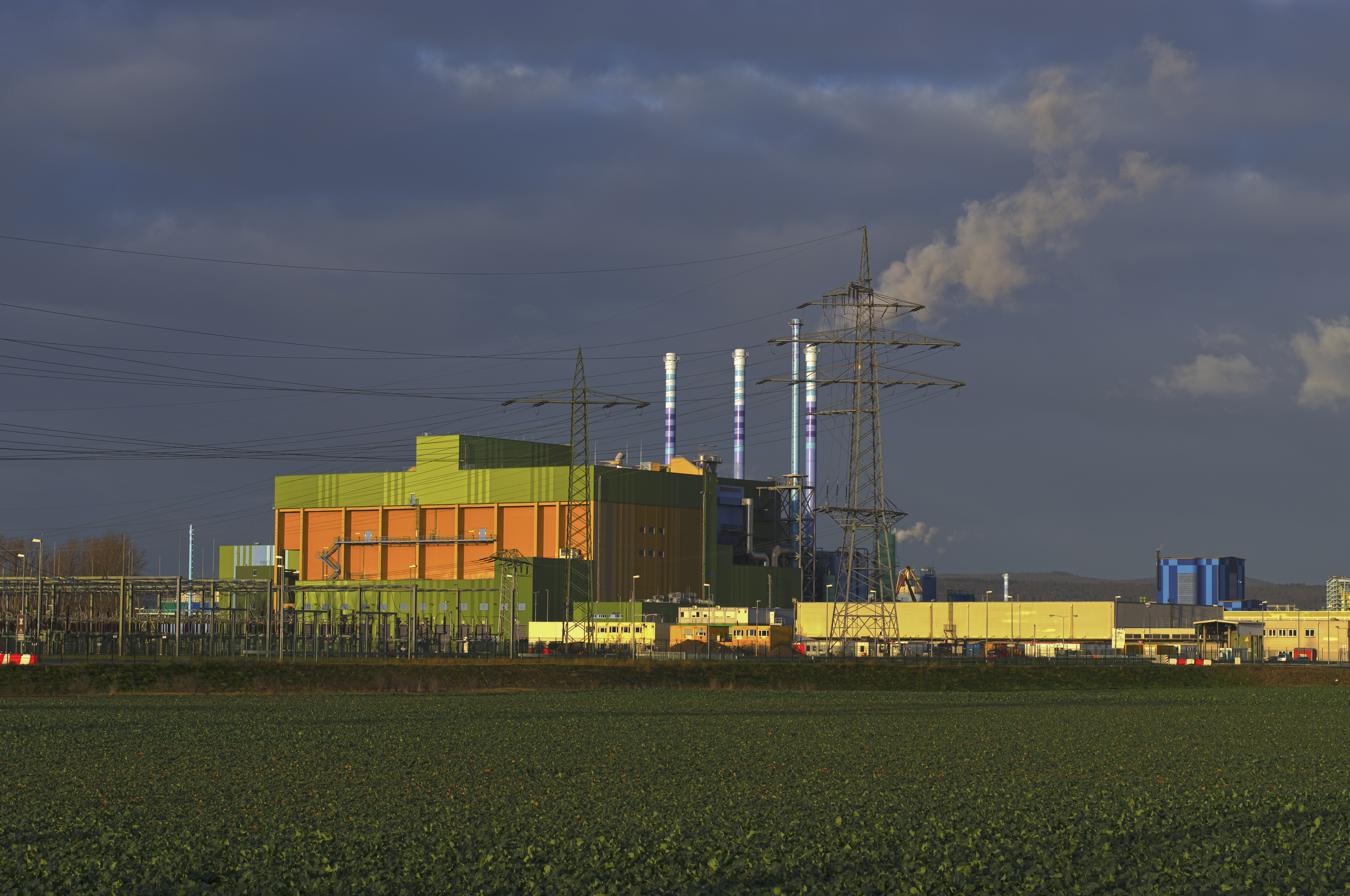
Industry park Höchst - waste-to-energy plant - Industriepark Höchst - Müllverbrennungsanlage - 07

=== Selling waste to a third party ===
More unfamiliar than other types, it is possible for a company to sell its waste to a third party. This third party will purchase the waste for reuse in their own production process. In addition to the sale of waste, there are also third parties which will retrieve your waste for you if they are capable of disposing of it more efficiently and/or affordably.

=== Waste to energy ===
Other options for diversion are composting and waste-to-energy: converting primary waste into various types of energy such as heat or electricity.

== Types of landfills ==
=== Open dump ===
An open dump is an area where unwanted waste is disposed of with no regulations or restrictions; they often produce adverse effects on the environment. The Resources Conservation and Recovery Act of 1976 prohibited open dumping, therefore making it illegal in many states.

=== Sanitary landfill ===
A sanitary landfill is where waste is disposed of in thin layers little by little; each layer is covered and compacted with soil to prevent foul odors and wind blown litter. This method prevents the creation of safety and public health hazards; this landfill has four requirements before it is built. The first requirement is that it must have absolute leachate security; the bottom of the landfill can be lined with a Synthetic liner that prevents leachate from entering the ground water. The next step is it has to be a two foot non permeable clay on top of the liner before the Waste can be placed in the cell. Secondly, there must be formal engineering preparations and planning in order to ensure the success of the landfill. Thirdly, permanent supervision must be present in all stages of the landfill also to ensure success and sustainability. Lastly, the placement and compacting of waste must be planned to prevent pest and vermin infestations.

=== Secure landfill ===
A secure landfill is where hazardous waste is deposited since it requires a much more stringent regulation than municipal waste. The landfill must have at least two impermeable liners as well as a system for leachate collection to prevent any water contamination. In addition to this, the landfill must also have a groundwater monitoring system in case there is a leak; the wells can be pumped to remove the contaminated water for treatment.

==== Deep-well injection ====
Deep-well injection is a form of disposing of liquid hazardous waste. The liquid waste is pumped into porous limestone or sandstone through a steel casing, and high pressure is applied in order to permanently store the waste within the pores and fissures of the rocks. The limestone or sandstone used for injection must be located beneath an impermeable layer of clay or rock at least 0.5 mile below the surface. This option generally does not require pre-treatment of the waste and is one of the more inexpensive options, however it poses a risk of hazardous waste leakage.

== Legislation ==
=== United States ===
==== California ====
The California Integrated Waste Management Act mandated all Californian cities and counties to divert 25% of their solid waste by 1990 and 50% by 2000 through planning and programs; this is managed by the California Department of Resources Recycling and Recovery (CalRecycle), and they also provide assistance in creating plans and programs. The percentage of solid waste required to be diverted has remained at 50% each year.

==== Maryland ====
The Maryland Department of the Environment (MDE) promotes the idea of waste diversion by partnering with Maryland's jurisdictions as well as the public and private sectors. All counties and Baltimore City are required to recycle 15% of waste generated (populations under 150,000) or 20% (populations over 150,000) due to The Maryland Recycling Act (MRA); the state government is also required to recycle at least 20% of their solid waste.

==== Pennsylvania ====
The Municipal Waste Planning Recycling and Waste Reduction Act (Act 101) was passed in 1988 which first initiated a statewide recycling program in Pennsylvania. As of 2016, at least 94% of Pennsylvania residents had access to recycling while 79% of the same population have direct access through curb side pick up programs. This act also required that individual counties develop efficient plans to combat the waste which will need disposed of in the next 10+ years. Success of Pennsylvania's recycling programs can be seen in the numbers. Over 6.12 million tons of waste were recycled into resources in 2013. This amount of recycling constitutes to 7.5 million tons of carbon dioxide emissions that were diverted from entering the air. The amount of carbon dioxide that this single state reduced in one year is equivalent to taking 1.58 million vehicles off of the road for one full year.

=== Europe ===
European waste legislation focuses upon the diversion of biodegradable waste from landfill, due to its potential to add to the effects of climate change.

== Waste diversion rate ==
Calculating waste diversion rates is an important tool for households and especially businesses to use. It is a KPI in indicating a successful recycling program. By tracking progress weekly, changes can be made to improve week to week. A simple formula is used to calculate the waste diversion rate, as follows:

(Weight of Recycling / (Weight of Recycling + Weight of Garbage)) X 100

Waste should be labeled with the name of the area in which they were received. For businesses, this will be helpful in implementing programs; what may work for one part of the company may not work for another. The goal is to calculate a number as close to one hundred as possible. This would imply that one hundred percent of your waste is recycled. If a lower number is calculated, changes are required to improve the score. When a need to change the recycling plan is recognized, you must effectively communicate the plan to all members involved to make sure it is implemented in full. After the plan is implemented, try measuring the waste diversion rate again. Measure the changes to see if the new plan has produced clear benefits.

== Waste diversion validation ==
The UL is a global independent safety science company which is working to find and improve current technologies and the public use of these things. They work to innovate the usage to promote a world where these luxuries and a healthy environment can co-inhabit the planet. They are three different levels of validations which the UL uses to honor the companies who manage their waste in environmentally healthy ways. Facilities are recognized as "Zero Waste" if they can consistently measure at a waste diversion rate of 100 percent. Facilities which are granted "Virtually Zero," maintain a waste diversion rate of 98 percent or higher. If facilities can manage to keep a waste diversion rate of 80 percent or higher, they are recognized as operating with landfill waste diversion.

== Zero waste ==
Full article on Zero Waste

=== What does it mean to operate at zero waste? ===
A zero waste system is one which redesigns the traditional production system. Rather than using natural resources which are scarce, it promotes the reuse of waste to create new products. This process continues endlessly, constantly making product from the waste created by the last production process.

=== A zero waste system ===
A zero waste society will be led by motivated citizens. Responsible policies must be enacted which will provide regulations to follow to achieve zero waste. Regulations and closed loop manufacturing systems will create a clean and efficient manufacturing process. Programs will be enacted locally to promote education and awareness over the importance of operating at zero waste and ways to effectively do so. Even after a zero waste production process is created, there is still remaining waste that must be properly disposed of. This requires recovery infrastructure. This infrastructure would look to replace landfills. It has a potential to recover upwards of 90% of waste that has entered and is present in landfills to date.

== See also ==
- Landfill Allowance Trading Scheme
- Landfill tax
