= Sevilla process =

EU stakeholder process

The Sevilla process is a participatory stakeholder process to establish environmental standards in the European Union. It comprises a structured exchange of information between EU Member States, industry, environmental non-governmental organizations, and the European Commission to draw up and review Best Available Techniques (BAT) reference documents (so-called 'BREFs'), pursuant to Article 13(1) of the Industrial Emissions Directive 2010/75/EU, which has been amended in 2024 by Directive (EU) 2024/1785.

== Overview ==
The Sevilla process is codified into law by Implementing Decision 2012/119/EU, which contains detailed provisions on how to organize the information exchange, collect data, draw-up, review, and structure Best Available Techniques reference documents (BREFs). A key element in each BREF is the section on 'BAT conclusions'. This section is adopted through a Comitology procedure and subsequently published as EU Implementing Decision in the Official Journal of the European Union. 'BAT conclusions' should be considered by EU Member States as reference when setting permit conditions for agro-industrial installations covered under the Industrial Emissions Directive.

Since 1997, the European Commission has organized and coordinated the Sevilla process through the European Integrated Pollution Prevention and Control Bureau (EIPPCB; within DG Joint Research Centre) and DG Environment. In 2024, the EIPPCB became the European Bureau for Research on Industrial Transformation and Emissions (EU-BRITE).

The process owes its name to the city of Seville, Spain, where the Joint Research Centre steers the co-creation of environmental regulation on products, waste, and agro-industrial activities. Approaches similar to the Sevilla processes are followed in the European Union in other policy domains, for example, to establish criteria for ecolabels, product design, and energy labels.

Countries such as Kazakhstan, Russia, and South Korea have mirrored the Sevilla process to implement BAT-based policies. The Organization for Economic Cooperation and Development (OECD) manages a project on Best Available Techniques (BAT). Under this project, the OECD set up an expert group that shares best practices and provides guidance on how to establish BAT, BAT-associated emission and environmental performance levels, as well as BAT-based permitting systems for industrial installations.

== Drawing up and review of BREFs ==
According to Implementing Decision 2012/119/EU, the Sevilla process to draw up and review Best Available Techniques reference documents (BREFs) comprises the following steps:

1. Preparation for the drawing up or review of a BREF for a certain activity or industry sector.
2. Activation or re-activation of a technical working group, which involves calling for confirmation of membership and for initial positions on scope, key environmental issues, and other items to be addressed in the BREF.
3. Kick-off meeting of the technical working group, which clarifies the scope of the BREF, the organisation of work, and seeks agreement on the key environmental issues to be addressed.
4. Collection of information, involving the collection of emission or consumption data on key environmental issues and the gathering of bulk information to characterise techniques; members of the technical working group can comment on the submitted information; EU-BRITE (formerly EIPPCB) may participate in site visits and start drafting the BREF.
5. Drawing up of a first formal draft of the BREF by EU-BRITE (formerly EIPPCB); this draft is made available to the technical working group for commenting in a formal consultation.
6. Optional: Elaboration of a second formal draft of the BREFs EU-BRITE (formerly EIPPCB) (typically done for new BREFs or BREFs undergoing substantial revisions), accompanied by a background document, which assesses the major comments received; the second draft is made available to the technical working group for commenting in a formal consultation.
7. Final meeting supported by a background paper of EU-BRITE (formerly EIPPCB) to assess the major comments received; discussion of BAT conclusions with the aim to achieve consensus within the technical working group.
8. Pre-final draft of the BREF, submitted for a short commenting period to the technical working group; the updated final draft and an assessment of the final comments received are made available to the Forum established under Article 13 of the Industrial Emissions Directive 2010/75/EC.
9. Presentation of the final draft to the Forum, which provides an opinion on the final draft BREF; the European Commission makes the opinion publicly available.

The section on 'BAT conclusions' within a BREF is subsequently voted in a Comitology procedure and, once passed, published as Implementing Decision in the Official Journal of the European Union. All final BREFs are publicly available on the webpage of the EIPPCB.
