= NanoMemPro IPPC Database =

The NanoMemPro IPPC database focus the operations where membranes are introduced as Best Available Techniques in the industrial areas addressed by the IPPC Directive. The Integrated Pollution Prevention and Control (IPPC) Directive was adopted by the European Council on September 24, 1996. It defines the obligations with which highly polluting industrial and agricultural activities must comply.

It establishes a procedure for authorizing these activities: a permit is issued if certain environmental conditions are met. The IPPC Directive aims to minimise pollution from various sources throughout the European Union (it concerns both new and existing installations). To do so, all industrial installations covered by the Annex I of the IPPC Directive (see) are required to obtain an authorisation (permit) from the authorities in the EU countries before they are allowed to operate. The permits granted must be based on the concept of Best Available Techniques (or BAT).

== Features ==
The IPPC Directive covers 33 industrial sectors where in almost all of them membrane processes appear as BAT, not only as an end-of-pipe solution for effluent treatment but mainly as a part of the industrial production processes.

Membrane process integration play a crucial role, depending on the industrial sector in which they are integrated, and these roles may be:

- Confinement of pollutants in concentrate streams (that may be further treated by destructive processes),
- Permeate recycle or re-use in the industrial process, thus reducing water input and discharge,
- Water recycling and effluent minimization, tending to zero discharge industrial processes.

The IPPC Database was designed by the NanoMemPro Network of Excellence to focus the operations where membranes are introduced as BAT in the industrial areas addressed by the IPPC Directive documents. The Database built allows any user to search information upon the following criteria:

- Membrane process (Reverse Osmosis, Nanofiltration, etc.),
- Industrial sector (Pulp and Paper, Textile Industry, etc.),
- State of Reference document approval (BREF, DRAFT, etc.).

The information states which membrane processes are defined as a BAT in a given industrial sector and what is the application/purpose of that membrane process(es). When accessing the Database, one can enter a username and password. This password insertion is used only by the database manager. To view and search the information of the database, just press the OK button, ignoring the password insertion procedure. This IPPC Database is available in the NanoMemPro website.
