= SWMP =

SWMP may refer to:

- Smith & Wesson M&P, a semi-automatic pistol intended for military and police usage
- Stormwater management pond, an artificial pond used to prevent flooding
- Site waste management plan

== See also ==
- Swamp
