= Gate fee =

A gate fee (or tipping fee) is the charge levied upon a given quantity of waste received at a waste processing facility.

In the case of a landfill it is generally levied to offset the cost of opening, maintaining and eventually closing the site. It may also include any landfill tax which is applicable in the region. The gate fee differs from the waste removal fee which is the charge levied on people in areas, such as Ireland, where waste collection is not covered as part of local taxes.

With waste treatment facilities such as incinerators, mechanical biological treatment facilities or composting plants the fee offsets the operation, maintenance, labour costs, capital costs of the facility along with any profits and final disposal costs of any unusable residues.

The fee can be charged per load, per tonne, or per item depending on the source and type of the waste.

== See also ==
- Waste legislation
- Waste management
