= Integrated Pollution Prevention and Control =

Directive 2008/1/EC
- European Union directive
- Title: IPPC Directive
- Made by: European Parliament & Council
- Made under: Article 175(1)
- Journal reference: OJL 24 of 29 January 2008, pp. 8–29

History
- Date made: 15 January 2008
- Entry into force: 18 February 2008

Other legislation
- Replaces: Directive 96/61/EC

Directive 2008/1/EC of the European Parliament and of the Council of 15 January 2008 concerning integrated pollution prevention and control is a directive of the European Union. It replaces the Council Directive 96/61/EC of 24 September 1996 on the same subject matter; both are commonly referred to as IPPC Directive.

From 2005 to 2007, the effect of the directive was assessed. In 2010, a revised wording was published, integrated with 6 other European directives regulating large industrial sites, into the Industrial Emissions Directive 2010/75/EU, short IED.

== European IPPC Bureau ==
The European IPPC Bureau was established in 1997 to organize an exchange of information between the European Commission, EU Member States, industries concerned, and non-governmental organizations promoting environmental protection for drawing up and reviewing Best Available Techniques (short: 'BAT') reference documents (short: 'BREFs'). These reference documents, specifically the BAT conclusions therein, provide the basis for EU Member States to grant operating permits for large agro-industrial installations. The information exchange is codified into law by Commission Implementing Decision 2012/119/EU and referred to as Sevilla process, named after the city of Seville where the European IPPC Bureau is located.

=== Similar agencies ===
- Climate Change Agreement
- US EPA – SPCC

== See also ==
- Best Available Techniques Reference Document (BREF)
- NanoMemPro IPPC Database
