= Sollefteå Hospital =

Geography
- Location: Sollefteå, Västernorrland County, Sweden
- Coordinates: 63°10′28″N 17°14′13″E

Links
- Lists: Hospitals in Sweden

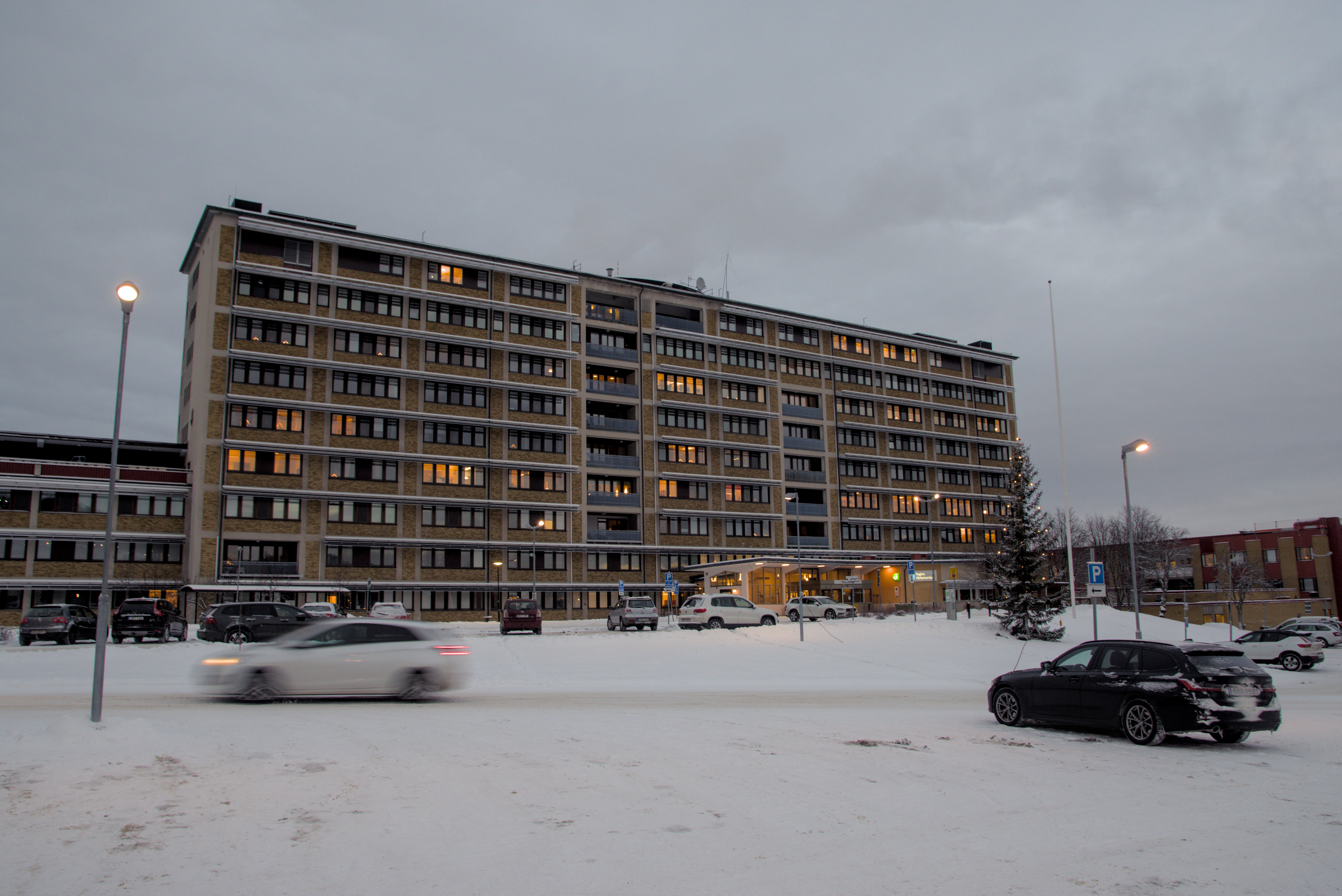
Sollefteå Hospital

Sollefteå Hospital (Swedish: Sollefteå sjukhus) is a hospital in Sollefteå in Västernorrland County, Sweden. The hospital was the first site to use an automated vacuum collection system, with the first system installed in 1961.
