= Metropolitan borough =

Type of local government district in England

Metropolitan district
- Also known as: Metropolitan borough
- Category: Local authority districts
- Location: England
- Found in: Metropolitan county
- Created by: Local Government Act 1972
- Created: 1 April 1974
- Number: 36 (as of 2008)
- Possible status: City
- Additional status: Borough
- Populations: 0.1 – 1.1 million

A metropolitan borough (or metropolitan district) is a type of local government district in England. Created in 1974 by the Local Government Act 1972, metropolitan boroughs are defined in English law as metropolitan districts within metropolitan counties. All of the metropolitan districts have been granted or regranted royal charters giving them borough status (and in some cases, they also have city status). Metropolitan boroughs are now a form of unitary authority, due to the abolition of metropolitan county councils by the Local Government Act 1985. Metropolitan boroughs pool much of their authority in joint boards and other arrangements that cover whole metropolitan counties, such as local enterprise partnerships and strategic authorities, with most of the latter having a directly elected metropolitan mayor.

== History ==
=== London metropolitan boroughs (1900–1965) ===
The term "metropolitan borough" was first used for administrative subdivisions of the County of London between 1900 and 1965. There were 28 of these metropolitan boroughs, which were replaced by a new system of larger London boroughs in 1965, when the County of London was replaced by Greater London.

=== Current metropolitan boroughs ===
The current metropolitan boroughs originated as metropolitan districts created in 1974 as subdivisions of new metropolitan counties, created to cover the six largest urban areas in England outside Greater London. The new districts replaced the previous system of county boroughs, municipal boroughs, and urban and rural districts.

Metropolitan districts were originally parts of a two-tier structure of local government, and shared power with metropolitan county councils. They differed from non-metropolitan districts in the division of powers between district and county councils. Metropolitan districts were local education authorities, and were also responsible for social services and libraries. In non-metropolitan counties these services were (and are) the responsibility of county councils.

Many metropolitan districts were boroughs from their establishment on 1 April 1974; others gained borough status later.

In 1986 the metropolitan county councils were abolished under the Local Government Act 1985 and most of their functions were devolved to the metropolitan boroughs, making them, to a large extent, unitary authorities in all but name. At the same time some of the functions of the abolished metropolitan county councils were taken over by joint bodies such as passenger transport authorities, and joint fire, police and waste disposal authorities.

== Metropolitan district councils ==
The metropolitan districts are administered by metropolitan district councils. They are the principal local authorities in the six metropolitan counties and are responsible for running most local services, such as schools, social services, waste collection, and roads.

== List of metropolitan boroughs ==
Metropolitan county	Metropolitan boroughs	Number	County population (2024)
Merseyside	Liverpool, Knowsley, St Helens, Sefton, Wirral	5	1,475,541
Greater Manchester	Manchester, Bolton, Bury, Oldham, Rochdale, Salford, Stockport, Tameside, Trafford, Wigan	10	3,009,664
South Yorkshire	Sheffield, Barnsley, Doncaster, Rotherham	4	1,430,623
Tyne and Wear	Newcastle upon Tyne, Gateshead, South Tyneside, North Tyneside, Sunderland	5	1,178,389
West Midlands	Birmingham, Coventry, Dudley, Sandwell, Solihull, Walsall, Wolverhampton	7	3,036,605
West Yorkshire	Leeds, Bradford, Calderdale, Kirklees, Wakefield	5	2,435,236
Total		36	12,566,058

== See also ==
- Borough
- County borough
- ISO 3166-2:GB, subdivision codes for the United Kingdom
- Metropolitan boroughs of the County of London
- Non-metropolitan district
- Political make-up of local councils
- Subdivisions of England
