= Landfill Allowance Trading Scheme =

The Landfill Allowance Trading Scheme, LATS, is an initiative by the UK government, through DEFRA to help reduce the amount of biodegradable municipal waste (BMW) sent to landfill.

== How does it work? ==
The Waste and Emissions Trading Act 2003 provides the legal framework for the scheme and for the allocation of tradable landfill allowances to each waste disposal authority in England. These allowances will convey the right for a waste disposal authority to landfill a certain amount of biodegradable municipal waste in a specified scheme year.

Each waste disposal authority is able to determine how to use its allocation of allowances in the most effective way. It will be able to trade allowances with other authorities, save them for future years (bank) or use some of its future allowances in advance (borrow). This will allow individual waste disposal authorities to use their allowances in accordance with their investment strategy.

== Performance ==
In its first year, 2005/6, the total tonnage of biodegradable waste that could be landfilled in England was 15,196,000. The calculated amount that was landfilled was 12,386,666 tonnes, 18.5% less BMW than they were allocated.

Although it was deemed "a major driver of rapid landfill diversion and recycling rates" by the European Union, after 2010 the landfill tax had a greater effect in waste disposal.

== Ten LATS facts ==
- The LATS was launched on 1 April 2004. Allowances were allocated to each waste disposal authority at a level that will enable England to meet its targets, as a contribution to the UK targets, under the Landfill Directive.
- The flexibilities of trading, banking and borrowing will enable waste disposal authorities to meet their obligations under the scheme in the most cost-effective way.
- Trading is not mandatory, but it is an opportunity. The advantage of trading for local authorities is that overcomes the fact that different waste disposal authorities will face different diversion costs depending on their particular circumstances.
- Unlimited banking is allowed between target years but allowances cannot be banked out of a target year or the year preceding a target year.
- Authorities are able to borrow up to 5% of the next year's allowance, although allowances cannot be borrowed into the target year or the year preceding a target year as this may cause England as a whole to breach its target.
- Trading and Borrowing must be recorded on the web-based allowance Register that is being developed by Defra.
- The Environment Agency, the monitoring authority for England, will use the mass balance process to monitor the amount of biodegradable waste sent to landfill in any year by each waste disposal authority (WDA).
- WDAs will be required to provide quarterly returns to the Environment Agency within three months at the end of each quarter via WasteDataFlow.
- A fixed penalty of £150/tonne will be incurred if a waste disposal authority breaches its landfill allowances target in the scheme year.
- There is no reason why an authority should ever need to pay a penalty - the six-month reconciliation period at the end of each scheme year will give authorities the opportunity to trade or borrow allowances to ensure that they comply with their obligations.

== Definition Clarity ==
London's Western Riverside Waste Authority has declared that LATS guidance is flawed. The initial definition of municipal waste counted it as any waste that originated from houses or households. The most recent LATS guidance indicates that municipal waste is any waste under the control of the waste disposal authority. The problem lies when the waste disposal authority collects a proportion of commercial and industrial waste, which in one piece of legislation is counted and in the other is exempt. This leads to the potential for fines for some authorities.

== See also ==
- Biodegradability
- Biodegradable waste
- Landfill tax
