= European Union Committee System =

The European Union Committee System is an informal category of committees involved in the processing of European Union (EU) legislation.

The committees, which are active in different phases of the EU legislative process, include Commission expert groups (which help generate policy ideas and formulate draft proposals), Council working parties (which help in deciding legislation), and comitology committees (which oversee the implementation of laws). The different committees are chaired by different institutions—usually the European Commission or Council of the European Union—and include different kind of members, ranging from public to private actors.

Also involved in the European Union Committee System are European Parliament committees (which process proposals from the Commission) and committees associated with the European External Action Service (although committees associated with this relatively new organisation are not yet well understood).

Issues surrounding the European Union Committee System include their transparency, since some of the committees described above are informal yet quite powerful in shaping and deciding legislation. Since the late 1990s, an increasing amount of attention has been placed on the committee system (mainly from the European Parliament) in order to shine light on their operation, mandate, and impact on European legislative outcomes.
