= Priority product =

In waste management and extended producer responsibility, a priority product is a product that can create a high level of environmental harm.

The United States Environmental Protection Agency defines items such as electronics, products containing mercury, batteries, medical products, carpet and packaging as priority products.

A priority product is a specific term defined in the New Zealand Waste Minimisation Act 2008 as one which could cause significant environmental harm, will benefit from reuse or recycling and is able to be managed under a product stewardship scheme.

== See also ==
- List of waste management topics
