= European Pathway to Zero Waste =

European Pathway to Zero Waste is an EU demonstration project part funded by The LIFE Programme (LIFE+), the EU's funding instrument for the environment and is a partnership between the Environment Agency and Waste & Resources Action Programme (WRAP). The project has been set up to investigate practical ways to achieve zero waste to landfill in the South East of England. It will share the results with colleagues both in the UK and in relevant EU Member States. Zero waste in this context is an approach to supporting the sustainable use of resources by business to benefit both the economy and the environment. It concentrates on reducing, re-using, recycling and recovering energy from waste. The project will run to March 2013.
