= British environmental law =

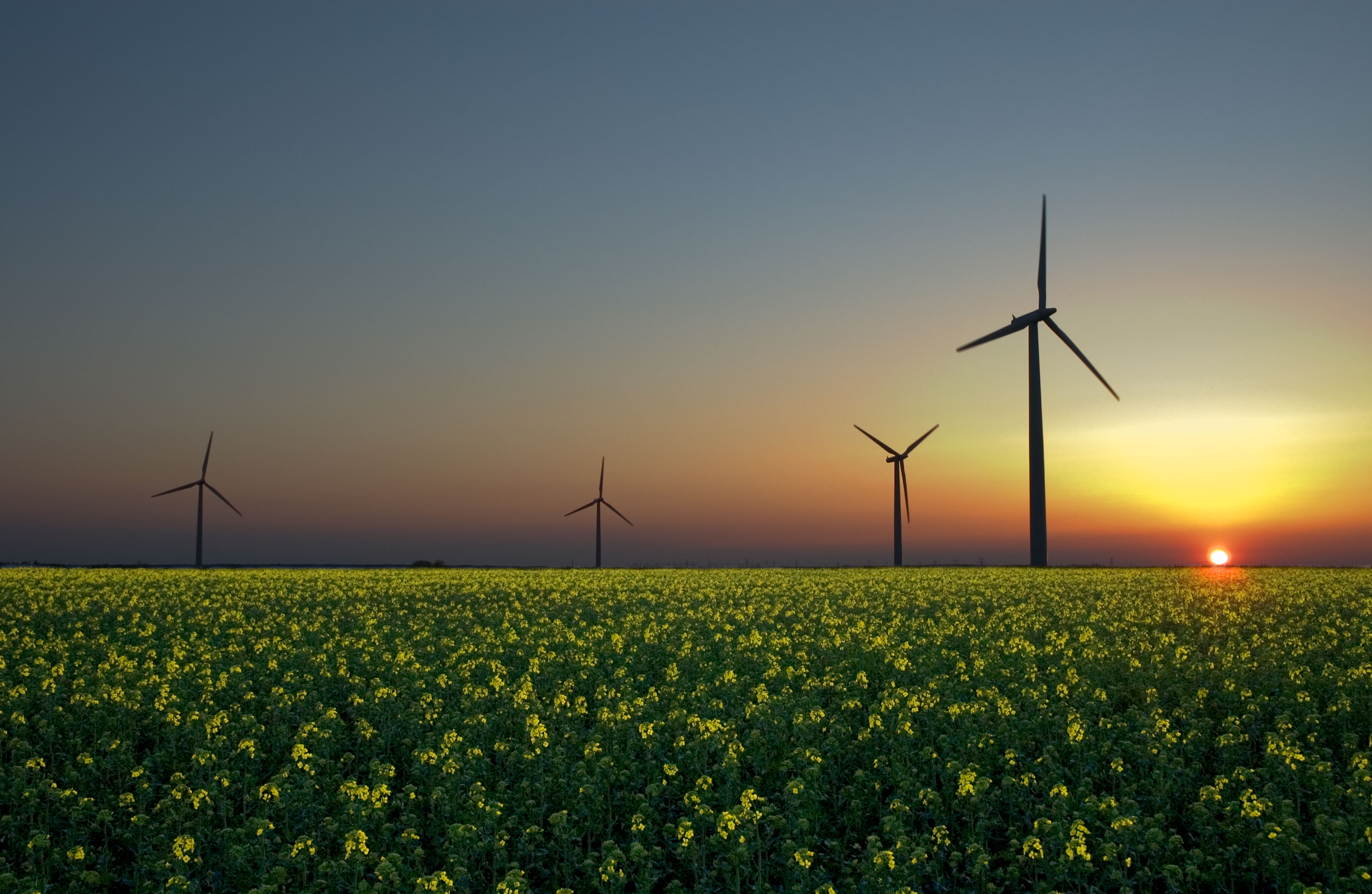
Wind power in the United Kingdom was the source of around 3% of total electricity generation in 2009.

British environmental law concerns the protection of the environment in the United Kingdom. Environmental law is increasingly a European and an international issue, due to the cross border issues of air and water pollution, and man-made climate change.

== History ==
In the common law, the primary protection was found in the tort of nuisance, but this only allowed for private actions for damages or injunctions if there was harm to land; thus issues such as smells emanating from pig sties, strict liability against dumping rubbish, or damage from exploding dams are included. Private enforcement, however, was limited and found to be woefully inadequate to deal with major environmental threats, particularly threats to common resources.

- 1306, Edward I briefly banned coal fires in London.
- John Evelyn, Fumifugium (1661) argued for burning fragrant wood instead of mineral coal, which he believed would reduce coughing.
- Ballad of Gresham College (1661) describes how the smoke "does our lungs and spirits choke, Our hanging spoil, and rust our iron."
- In 1800, one million tons of coal were burned in London, and 15 million across the UK.
- Smoke Nuisance Abatement (Metropolis) Act 1853
- John Snow in 1854 discovered that the water pump on Broad Street, Soho was responsible for 616 cholera deaths because it was contaminated by an old cesspit leaking fecal bacteria. Germ theory of disease began to replace miasma theory that had lingered since the Black Death.

During the "Great Stink" of 1858, the dumping of sewerage into the River Thames began to smell so ghastly in the summer heat that Parliament had to be evacuated. The Metropolitan Commission of Sewers Act 1848 had allowed the Metropolitan Commission for Sewers to close cesspits around the city in an attempt to "clean up" but this simply led people to pollute the river. In 19 days, Parliament passed a further Act to build the London sewerage system.

- Alkali Act 1863 and Alkali Act 1874, amended 1906
- WS Jevons, The Coal Question; An Inquiry Concerning the Progress of the Nation, and the Probable Exhaustion of Our Coal Mines (1865)
- Ground Game Act 1880, Night Poaching Act 1828, Game Act 1831, game preservation
- James Johnston (socialist politician), president of the Smoke Abatement League, international conference in 1911.

London also suffered from terrible air pollution, and this culminated in the "Great Smog" of 1952, which in turn triggered a legislative response: the Clean Air Act 1956. The basic regulatory structure was to set limits on emissions for households and business (particularly burning coal) while an inspectorate would enforce compliance. It required zones for smokeless fuel to be burned and relocated power stations. The Clean Air Act 1968 required tall chimneys to disperse pollution.

On 6 April 2008 the previous Waste Management Licensing Regulations were replaced for England and Wales by the Environmental Permitting Regulations 2007. There are no longer separate regulation regimes for waste management and PPC (Pollution Prevention Control) activities, with both being regulated by way of Environmental Permits. For Scotland, the 1994 Regulations were replaced by the Waste Management Licensing (Scotland) Regulations 2011 (SSI 2011/228) with effect from 27 March 2011

== Environmental protection ==
The Environment Act 2021, passed in the UK, sets forth new environmental targets and establishes the Office for Environmental Protection (OEP) as an oversight body. It outlines a governance framework and mandates an environmental improvement plan for England and Wales, focusing on enhancing environmental standards and biodiversity. The Act's implementation is facilitated through various commencement regulations, introducing legally binding targets in areas such as biodiversity, water, air quality, and conservation. The Environmental Improvement Plan 2023, an update to the 25 Year Environment Plan initiated in 2018, specifies how to achieve these targets, incorporating a review every five years.

Legislation under the Environment Act 2021 specifies legally binding environmental targets:

- The Environmental Targets (Biodiversity) (England) Regulations 2023
- The Environmental Targets (Water) (England) Regulations 2023
- The Environmental Targets (Fine Particulate Matter) (England) Regulations 2023
- The Environmental Targets (Marine Protected Areas) Regulations 2023
- The Environmental Targets (Residual Waste) (England) Regulations 2023
- The Environmental Targets (Woodland and Trees Outside Woodland) (England) Regulations 2023

=== Pollution ===
- Control of Pollution Act 1974
- Environmental Protection Act 1990
- Environmental Damage Regulations (2015) - implement the EU's Environmental Liability Directive 2004/35/EC, originally introduced in 2009 and revised in 2015.

=== Wildlife ===
- Wildlife and Countryside Act 1981
- Weeds Act 1959
- Badgers Act 1991
- Protection of Badgers Act 1992
- Hunting Act 2004

=== Conservation ===
- Planning (Listed Buildings and Conservation Areas) Act 1990
- National Parks and Access to the Countryside Act 1949
- National parks of England and Wales and National parks of Scotland
- Ancient Monuments and Archaeological Areas Act 1979
- Countryside and Rights of Way Act 2000

=== Climate change ===
- Climate Change Act 2008
- Planning and Energy Act 2008
- Energy Act 2008
- Energy Act 2010
- Energy Act 2011

See also Environment Agency

== European and international law ==
- European Commissioner for the Environment
- European Climate Change Programme
- Water Framework Directive
- Birds Directive
- Habitats Directive
- United Nations Environment Programme

== See also ==
- English land law
- UK enterprise law
- Environmental law
- Environmental racism in Europe
- Conservation in the United Kingdom
- List of environmental laws by country
