= Best available technology =

Approved environmental solutions

The best available technology or best available techniques (BAT) is the technology approved by legislators or regulators for meeting output standards for a particular process, such as pollution abatement. Similar terms are best practicable means or best practicable environmental option. BAT is a moving target on practices, since developing societal values and advancing techniques may change what is currently regarded as "reasonably achievable", "best practicable" and "best available".

A literal understanding will connect it with a "spare no expense" doctrine which prescribes the acquisition of the best state of the art technology available, without regard for traditional cost-benefit analysis. In practical use, the cost aspect is also taken into account. See also discussions on the topic of the precautionary principle which, along with considerations of best available technologies and cost-benefit analyses, is also involved in discussions leading to formulation of environmental policies and regulations (or opposition to same).

== History ==
"But no person shall be subject to the foregoing penalties for any act done in the exercise of any right to which he is by law entitled, if he prove to the satisfaction of the court, before whom he is tried, that he has used the best practicable means, within a reasonable cost, to render harmless the liquid or solid matter so permitted to flow or to be put into waters."

Best practicable means was used for the first time in UK national primary legislation in section 5 of the Salmon Fishery Act 1861, and another early use was found in the Alkali Act Amendment Act 1874, but before that appeared in the Leeds Improvement Amendment Act 1848.

Best available techniques not entailing excessive costs (BATNEEC), sometimes referred to as best available technology, was introduced in 1984 into European Economic Community law with Directive 84/360/EEC.

The BAT concept was first time used in the 1992 OSPAR Convention for the protection of the marine environment of the North-East Atlantic for all types of industrial installations (for instance, chemical plants).

Some doctrine deem it already acquired the status of customary law.

In the United States, BAT or similar terminology is used in the Clean Air Act and Clean Water Act.

== European Union directives ==
Best available techniques not entailing excessive costs (BATNEEC), sometimes referred to as best available technology, was introduced in 1984 with Directive 84/360/EEC and applied to air pollution emissions from large industrial installations.

In 1996, Directive 84/360/EEC was superseded by the Integrated Pollution Prevention and Control (IPPC) Directive 96/61/EC, which applied the framework concept of Best Available Techniques (BAT) to, amongst others, the integrated control of pollution to the three media air, water and soil. The concept is also part of the directive's recast in 2008 (Directive 2008/1/EC) and its successor directive, the Industrial Emissions Directive 2010/75/EU published in 2010. A list, with "Adopted Documents", of industries which are subject to the IPPC directive contains more than 30 entries, including everything from the ceramic manufacturing industry to the wood-based panels production industry.

BAT for a given industrial sector are described in reference documents called BREFs (Best Available Techniques Reference documents), as defined in article 3(11) of the Industrial Emissions Directive. BREFs are the result of an exchange of information between European Union Member States, the industries concerned, non-governmental organizations promoting environmental protection and the European Commission pursuant to article 13 of the directive. This exchange of information is referred to as the Sevilla process because it is steered by the European IPPC Bureau within the Institute for Prospective Technological Studies of the European Commissions' Joint Research Centre, which is based in Seville. The process is codified into law by Commission Implementing Decision 2012/119/EU. The most important chapter of the BREFs, the BAT conclusions, are published as implementing decisions of the European Commission in the Official Journal of the European Union. According to article 14(3) of the Industrial Emissions Directive, the BAT conclusions shall be the reference for setting permit conditions of large industrial installations.

=== Pollution control ===
According to article 15(2) of the Industrial Emissions Directive, emission limit values and the equivalent parameters and technical measures in permits shall be based on the best available techniques, without prescribing the use of any technique or specific technology.

The directive includes a definition of best available techniques in article 3(10):

"best available techniques" means the most effective and advanced stage in the development of activities and their methods of operation which indicates the practical suitability of particular techniques for providing the basis for emission limit values and other permit conditions designed to prevent and, where that is not practicable, to reduce emissions and the impact on the environment as a whole:

- "techniques" includes both the technology used and the way in which the installation is designed, built, maintained, operated and decommissioned;
- "available" means those developed on a scale which allows implementation in the relevant industrial sector, under economically and technically viable conditions, taking into consideration the costs and advantages, whether or not the techniques are used or produced inside the Member State in question, as long as they are reasonably accessible to the operator;
- "best" means most effective in achieving a high general level of protection of the environment as a whole.

=== Food, drink and milk industries ===
A Reference Document on Best Available Techniques (BREF) in the food, drink and milk industries of the European Union was published in August 2006, and reflected an information exchange carried out according to Article 16.2 of Council Directive 96/61/EC. It runs to more than 600 pages, and is replete with tables and flowchart diagrams. The 2006 BREF on these industries was superseded by another published in January 2017, which runs to more than 1000 pages.

== United States environmental law ==
=== Clean Air Act ===
The Clean Air Act Amendments of 1990 require that certain facilities employ Best Available Control Technology to limit emissions.

...an emission limitation based on the maximum degree of reduction of each pollutant subject to regulation under this Act emitted from or which results from any major emitting facility, which the permitting authority, on a case-by-case basis, taking into account energy, environmental, and economic impacts and other costs, determines is achievable for such facility through application of production processes and available methods, systems, and techniques, including fuel cleaning, clean fuels, or treatment or innovative fuel combustion techniques for control of each such pollutant.

=== Clean Water Act ===
The Clean Water Act (CWA) requires issuance of national industrial wastewater discharge regulations (called "effluent guidelines"), which are based on BAT and several related standards.

...effluent limitations for categories and classes of point sources,... which (i) shall require application of the best available technology economically achievable for such category or class, which will result in reasonable further progress toward the national goal of eliminating the discharge of all pollutants. ...Factors relating to the assessment of best available technology shall take into account the age of equipment and facilities involved, the process employed, the engineering aspects of the application of various types of control techniques, process changes, the cost of achieving such effluent reduction, non-water quality environmental impact (including energy requirements), and such other factors as the Administrator deems appropriate.

In the development of the effluent standards, the BAT concept is a "model" technology rather than a specific regulatory requirement. The U.S. Environmental Protection Agency (EPA) identifies a particular model technology for an industry, and then writes a regulatory performance standard based on the model. The performance standard is typically expressed as a numeric effluent limit measured at the discharge point. The industrial facility may use any technology that meets the performance standard.

A related CWA provision for cooling water intake structures requires standards based on "best technology available."

...the location, design, construction, and capacity of cooling water intake structures reflect the best technology available for minimizing adverse environmental impact.

== International conventions ==
The concept of BAT is also used in a number of international conventions such as the Minamata Convention on Mercury, the Stockholm Convention on Persistent Organic Pollutants, or the OSPAR Convention for the protection of the marine environment of the North-East Atlantic.

== See also ==
- Appropriate technology
- Best Available Control Technology
- Lowest Achievable Emissions Rate
