= Merseyside Recycling and Waste Authority =

Former logo of the Merseyside Waste Disposal Authority

The Merseyside Recycling and Waste Authority (MRWA) (formerly Merseyside Waste Disposal Authority (MWDA)) is a statutory waste disposal authority that manages the municipal solid waste produced in Merseyside, England. MWDA was established in 1986 following the abolition of Merseyside County Council, to undertake the waste disposal for local authorities across Merseyside—Liverpool, Knowsley, Sefton, Wirral and St Helens. MWDA takes a lead in advocating waste minimisation, recycling and the safe and effective disposal of waste for Merseyside's residents and operates 14 Household Waste Recycling Centres. Veolia Environmental Services is the current contractor for the authority's major waste services contract.

The authority's revenue budget for 2010/2011 was set at £70.9m and is funded by way of a levy on each of the Merseyside District Councils which is apportioned on a waste tonnage basis.

The authority is also responsible for the aftercare of a number of closed landfill sites, which historically had been operated by the authority or its predecessors. These include the former landfill sites at Bidston Moss and Sefton Meadows.

MWDA is made up of nine elected members representing the five constituent district councils in the Merseyside area and consists of five Labour councillors, three Liberal Democrat councillors and one Conservative councillor.

As of 7 December 2011, the MWDA was renamed the Merseyside Recycling and Waste Authority and a new corporate logo with slogan "Merseyside ... A place where nothing is wasted" was introduced to replace the former corporate MWDA logo.

== See also ==
- Greater Manchester Waste Disposal Authority
