= Landfill Tax Credit Scheme =

The Landfill Tax Credit Scheme (LTCS) is a scheme for the distribution of funds generated from Landfill Tax in the United Kingdom. The scheme was established by the Landfill Tax Regulations in 1996.

The LTCS was designed to help mitigate the effects of landfill upon local communities. It encourages partnerships between landfill operators, their local communities and the voluntary and public sectors. Since 2014, a similar scheme operates in relation to Scottish Landfill Tax.
