= Public service agreement =

Public service agreements (PSAs) detailed the aims and objectives of UK government departments for a three-year period. PSAs were abolished in June 2010 by the Coalition Government.

Such agreements also "describe[d] how targets will be achieved and how performances against these targets will be measured". The agreements consisted of a departmental aim, a set of objectives and targets, and details of who is responsible for delivery.

The 30 agreed PSAs aimed to:

1. Raise the productivity of the UK economy
2. Improve the skills of the population, on the way to ensuring a better skills base by 2020
3. Ensure controlled, fair migration that protects the public and contributes to economic growth
4. Promote science and innovation in the UK
5. Deliver reliable and efficient transport networks that support economic growth
6. Deliver the conditions for business success in the UK
7. Improve the economic performance of all English regions and reduce the gap in economic growth rates between regions
8. Maximise employment opportunity for all
9. Halve the number of children in poverty by 2010–11, on the way to eradicating child poverty by 2020
10. Raise the educational achievement of all children and young people
11. Narrow the gap in educational achievement between children from low income and disadvantaged backgrounds and their peers
12. Improve the health and wellbeing of children and young people
13. Improve children and young people's safety
14. Increase the number of children and young people on the path to success
15. Address the disadvantage that individuals experience because of their gender, race, disability, age, sexual orientation, religion or belief
16. Increase the proportion of socially excluded adults in settled accommodation and employment, education or training
17. Tackle poverty and promote greater independence and wellbeing in later life
18. Promote better health and wellbeing for all
19. Ensure better care for all
20. Increase long term housing supply and affordability
21. Build more cohesive, empowered and active communities
22. Deliver a successful Olympic Games and Paralympic Games with a sustainable legacy and get more children and young people taking part in high quality PE and sport
23. Make communities safer
24. Deliver a more effective, transparent and responsive Criminal Justice System for victims and the public
25. Reduce the harm caused by alcohol and drugs
26. Reduce the risk to the UK and its interests overseas from international terrorism
27. Lead the global effort to avoid dangerous climate change
28. Secure a healthy natural environment for today and the future
29. Reduce poverty in poorer countries through quicker progress towards the Millennium Development Goals
30. Reduce the impact of conflict through enhanced UK and international efforts
