= Carbon management =

Carbon management may refer to:

- Carbon accounting
- Carbon capture, utilization and storage (CCUS)
- Carbon dioxide removal
- Climate change mitigation
