= Windermere Cruising Association =

The Windermere Cruising Association is a sailing club located at Windermere, a lake in Cumbria, England.

Formed in 1967, the Windermere Cruising Association (WCA) is a sailing club with a programme of social, cruising and racing. The club is RYA accredited and does not possess a club house, relying on local venues - indoors and on the banks of the lake - for its meetings and events.

== Winter Series ==
The WCA organises the Windermere Series. Over 50 yachts take part in this competitive series every other Sunday from November to March.
