= Quality Protocol =

A Quality Protocol is a national end of waste criteria developed by the Waste Protocols Project, a joint initiative between the Environment Agency and Waste & Resources Action Programme (WRAP). It is funded by the Department for Environment, Food and Rural Affairs (Defra), the Welsh Assembly Government (WAG) and the Northern Ireland Environment Agency (NIEA) as a business resource efficiency activity (BREW).

== Description ==
A Quality Protocol sets out criteria for the production of a product from a specific waste type. Compliance with these criteria is considered sufficient to ensure that the fully recovered product may be used without harm to human health or the environment and therefore without the need for waste management controls. In addition, the Quality Protocol indicates how compliance may be demonstrated and points to best practice for the use of the fully recovered product. The Quality Protocol further aims to provide increased market confidence in the quality of products made from waste and so encourage greater recovery and recycling.

The purpose of the Quality Protocol is to provide a uniform control process for producers, from which they can reasonably state and demonstrate that their product has been fully recovered and is no longer a waste. It also provides purchasers with a quality-managed product to common aggregate standards, which increases confidence in performance. Also, the framework created by the Protocol provides a clear audit trail for those responsible for ensuring compliance with Waste Management Legislation.

Work on producing protocols for eight other waste streams should be issued for public consultation in Summer 2007. This includes waste vegetable oil, flat glass, non-packaging plastics, tyres, contaminated soils, pulverised fuel ash and blast furnace slag.

== See also ==
- BSI PAS 100 Composting Standard
- CEN 343 for Refuse Derived Fuel
