= Civic amenity site =

Waste disposal or recycling facility

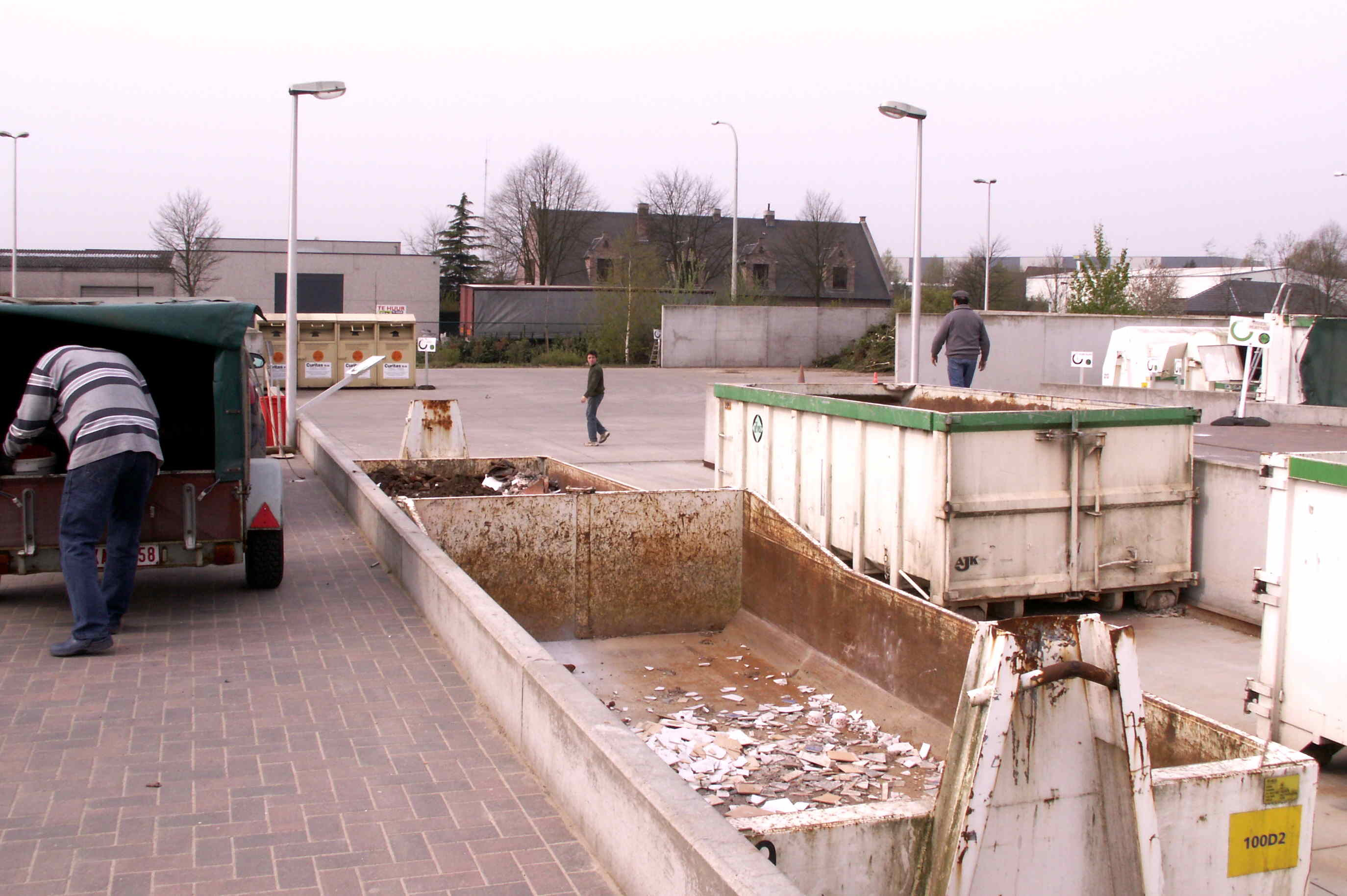
A civic amenity site

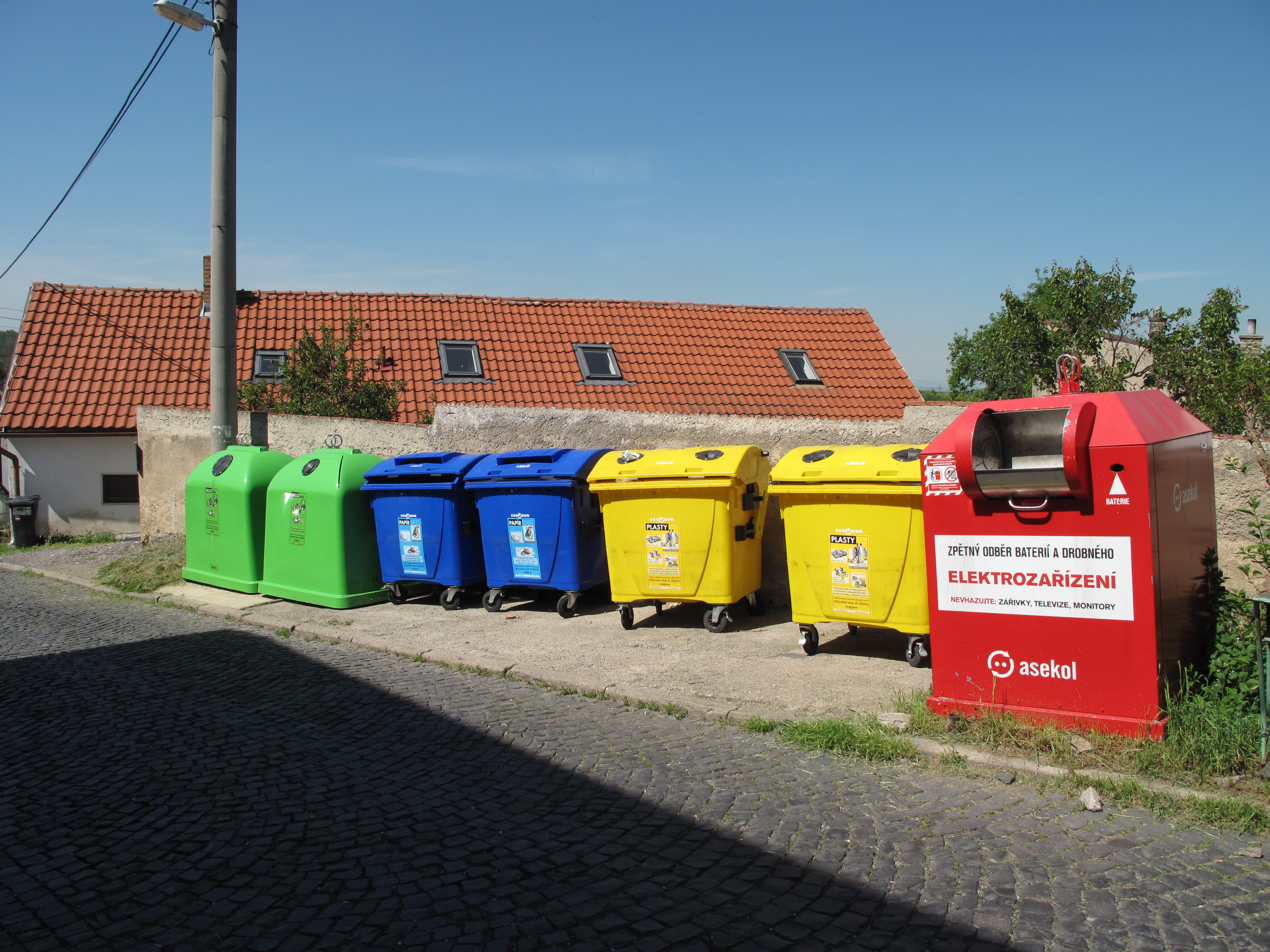
Sorted waste container stand in Buštěhrad, Central Bohemia, Czech Republic. Green containers are for glass, blue for paper, yellow for plastics and red for electrotechnical waste.

A civic amenity site (CA site) or household waste recycling centre (HWRC) (both terms are used in the United Kingdom) is a facility where the public can dispose of household waste and also often containing recycling points. Civic amenity sites are run by the local authority in a given area. Collection points for recyclable waste such as green waste, metals, glass and other waste types (including WVO) are available. Items that cannot be collected by local waste collection schemes such as bulky waste are also accepted.

In the United Kingdom, civic amenity sites are informally called "tips" or "dumps".

In continental Europe, there are usually several types of collection sites:

- sorted waste container stands: a group of containers of the most common recyclable household waste, such as plastics, paper, glass, metal cans, liquid packaging board, electrotechnical waste, recyclable clothing and so on. Such stands should be freely accessible by walking. They are often found near bus or tram stops, city squares, village commons, shops etc. A city or a country can have any colour convention to distinguish containers by type of waste.
- waste collection courtyards: except for the mentioned household waste, they are specialized for large waste from citizens: furniture, construction waste, compostable gardening waste – or special types of waste (chemical or other hazardous waste etc.). The waste is usually delivered by cars, vans or trucks and the station has an overseeing staff and opening hours, but services are free of charge. Smaller towns have one such site, cities can have more such courtyards in various neighbourhoods.
- waste purchase stations: especially for metal scrap (iron and other metals), but also for paper, glass etc. Such stations have been in existence longer than modern disposal stations. Coexistence of paid and free systems of collection can result in homeless, asocial or poor people picking waste from the free containers to sell at the waste purchase station.

== See also ==
- Transfer station (waste management)
