= BSI PAS 100 =

British industry standard for composts

The British Composting Association worked to establish an industry standard for composts, the BSI PAS 100 certified by the British Standards Institution. The specification covers the entire process; from raw materials and production methods, through quality control and lab testing ensuring certified composts are quality assured traceable safe and reliable. Description: Composting (waste), Biodegradability, Degradation, Waste disposal, Waste handling, Quality control, Biological hazards, Pathogens, Toxic materials, Toxins, Contaminants, Pollution control, Environmental management, Management operations, Performance, Marking, Labels, Fertilizers.

PAS stands for Publicly Available Specification

== See also ==
- Compost
- Composting
- Home composting
- Industrial composting
- List of composting systems
