= Landfill tax =

Tax levied on landfill operators to discourage landfill use

A landfill tax or levy is a form of tax that is applied in some countries to increase the cost of landfill. The tax is typically levied in units of currency per unit of weight or volume (£/t, €/t, $/yard³). The tax is in addition to the overall cost of landfill and forms a proportion of the gate fee.

== Reasons for landfill tax ==
A tax or fee may be imposed on landfills or other disposal facilities as a means of raising general revenues, to generate funds for inspection programs or long-term mitigation of environmental impacts related to disposal, or as a means of inhibiting disposal by raising the cost in comparison to preferable alternatives, in the same manner as an excise or "sin tax".

Landfilling is discouraged due to a number of key reasons:

- Climate change caused by landfill gas from biodegradable waste
- Loss of resources
  - Constraints on areas suitable for landfill sites
  - Loss of recyclable components of waste landfilled
- Nimby objections causing political problems

== Landfill tax by country ==
=== Australia ===
In Australia, the landfill levy rate is determined by state and territory governments, and depending on the factors involved in the formulation, it differs from one state to another. The first-ever implemented Australian levy scheme was enforced in New South Wales (NSW) metropolitan area in 1971, which was rated at $0.51 per tonne. A scheme that was subsequently followed by some other Australian states and territories. Except for Northern Territory (NT) and Tasmania (Tas), all of Australia’s other jurisdictions (Australian Capital Territory (ACT), NSW, Victoria (Vic), Queensland (Qld), South Australia (SA), Western Australia (WA)) have introduced landfill levies. The sources of disparity in landfill levy imposition are the location of waste disposal being metropolitan or regional, being obligatory versus voluntary, providing a tax exemption for certain materials and having levy zones. At the time of writing (2020), ACT has set the largest levy rates (metropolitan: $146.2, regional: $199.2) for construction and demolition (C&D) waste among Australian jurisdictions, followed by NSW (metropolitan: $141.2, regional: $81.3) and SA (metropolitan: $140, regional: $70). The main factors giving rise to non-uniform levy rates include state revenue requirements and priorities, cost disparity between jurisdictions and regional versus metropolitan areas, available facilities and regulatory framework.

=== New Zealand ===
In New Zealand the Waste Minimisation Act 2008 allowed for the charging of a landfill levy. Half of the landfill levy goes to local authorities with the other half going into a Waste Minimisation Fund. As of 2010 it is set at $10 a tonne but it can be reviewed by the Minister for the Environment.

=== United Kingdom ===
Landfill Tax was introduced in 1996 by Conservative Secretary of State for the Environment, John Gummer, and was the UK's first environmental tax. The tax is seen as a key mechanism in enabling the UK to meet its targets set out in the Landfill Directive for the landfilling of biodegradable waste. Through increasing the cost of landfill, other advanced waste treatment technologies with higher gate fees are made to become more financially attractive.

The amount of tax levied is calculated according to the weight of the material disposed of and whether it is active or inactive waste.

- Inactive waste covers most materials used in a building's fabric as well as earth excavated for foundations. Most forms of concrete, brick, glass, soil, clay and gravel are classified as inactive.
- Active waste covers all other forms of waste such as wood, ductwork, piping and plastics.

Inevitably there will be some mixing of waste such as inert bricks and concrete mixed with small amounts of wood or mineral dust packaged in polythene bags. It is for the producer of the waste to decide what is reasonable and acceptable in terms of active waste contamination of inert waste.

The landfill site operator is responsible for paying the tax and will pass the cost on to businesses and local councils on top of normal landfill fees. VAT is charged on the landfill fees and the landfill tax.

Operators can reduce their tax liability by making payments to the Landfill Communities Fund under the Landfill Tax Credit Scheme. The fund aids community or environmental projects in the vicinity of a landfill site and is regulated by ENTRUST, a company limited by guarantee.

Landfill tax rates 2013–14

- Standard rate for active waste: £80 per tonne
- Lower rate for inactive waste: £2.50 per tonne

Sections from the coalition government's Emergency Budget 2010:

- 2.128 The standard rate of landfill tax will increase by £8 per tonne each year from 1 April 2011 until at least 2014. There will be a floor under the standard rate at £80 per tonne, so that the rate will not fall below £80 per tonne from April 2014 until at least 2020.
- 2.129 New qualifying criteria for lower rated wastes will be legislated in the Finance Bill introduced in the autumn (2010), to come into effect on 1 April 2011.

Landfill tax rates 2015–16

From 1 April 2015 to April 2016 the landfill tax rates were:

- Standard rate for active waste: £82.60 per tonne
- Lower rate for inactive waste: £2.60 per tonne

With the Scotland Act 2012, the Scottish Government gained the devolved power to levy its own landfill tax. The Scottish Landfill Tax was introduced by the Landfill Tax (Scotland) Act 2014 and began to be payable on 1 April 2015.

In 2015 and 2016, there were concerns that some companies disposing waste to landfill were wrongly putting waste with a biodegradable and non-inert content into landfills at the inactive waste taxation level. A new testing regime was introduced, where a small amount of the load is tested to ascertain its biodegradable content.

Landfill tax rates 2018-19

From 1 April 2018 to April 2019 the landfill tax rates were:

- Standard rate for active waste: £88.95 per tonne
- Lower rate for inactive waste: £2.80 per tonne

Landfill tax rates from 1 April 2020

From 1 April 2020 the landfill tax rates are:

- Standard rate for active waste: £94.15 per tonne
- Lower rate for inactive waste: £3.00 per tonne

The Welsh Government took over responsibility for the tax in Wales from in 2018.

=== United States ===
The United States has numerous federal laws and regulations regarding the operation of landfills, but there is no national landfill tax or fee. Although states and local governments may choose to collect fees and taxes on the collection or disposal of solid waste.

==== California ====
Landfills in California are subject to fees and taxes levied by cities and counties, as well as by the state. The Integrated Waste Management Act of 1989 authorized a state fee (set at $1.40 per ton effective 2002-07-01) to fund the activities of the California Integrated Waste Management Board (CIWMB). Many cities and counties collect fees from landfills within their jurisdiction to recover the costs of local solid waste planning and inspection programs, to operate programs for the collection and disposal of household hazardous wastes, and to fund some costs of recycling and reuse programs.

Landfills in San Jose are subject to the highest disposal tax in California, with the Disposal Facility Tax set at $13.00 per ton in 1992.

== See also ==
- Landfill Allowance Trading Scheme
- Landfill Directive
- Landfill Tax Credit Scheme (LTCS) (in the UK)
