= Waste & Resources Action Programme =

WRAP
- Waste & Resources Action Programme
- Formation: 2000
- Type: British registered charity
- Purpose: To achieve a circular economy by reducing waste, developing sustainable products and using resources efficiently.
- Headquarters: United Kingdom
- Funding: Department for Environment, Food and Rural Affairs, Northern Ireland Executive, Zero Waste Scotland, Welsh Government, European Union
- Website: wrap.org.uk

WRAP logo 2024

WRAP (Waste & Resources Action Programme) is a British registered charity. It works with businesses, individuals and communities to achieve a circular economy, by helping them reduce waste, develop sustainable products and use resources in an efficient way.

== History ==
WRAP was established in 2000 as a company limited by guarantee and receives funding from the Department for Environment, Food and Rural Affairs, the Northern Ireland Executive, Zero Waste Scotland, the Welsh Government and the European Union.

== Initiatives ==
WRAP developed the "Recycle Now", "Love Food, Hate Waste" and "Love your Clothes" initiatives. These aim to help businesses, local authorities, community groups and individuals recycle and reuse more, and reduce food waste.

== Voluntary agreements ==
Over recent years it has also brokered a number of voluntary agreements with business including:

- The construction sector – with more than 700 companies succeeding in halving their waste to landfill by 2012
- The retail sector – through the Courtauld Commitments, food and drink organisations are working together to reduce their burden on the environment.
- The clothing industry – through the 'Sustainable Clothing Action Plan', working together to reduce the clothing industry footprint through sustainable design, reuse and recycling.
- The plastics sector – through the UK Plastics Pact, a collaborative voluntary agreement towards creating a Circular Economy for plastics in the United Kingdom, including targets of eliminating problematic and unnecessary plastic packaging items and polymers, and increasing the recyclability, reusability and overall recycled content in plastic packaging. The agreement ran from 2018 to 2025 and has been succeeded by the UK Packaging Pact.
- The packaging sector - through the UK Packaging Pact, a collaborative voluntary agreement - continues work of the UK Plastics Pact. The scope expanded, still including plastic, to other packaging materials such as glass, aluminium, steel, paper & card, and natural polymers. As of July 2026 over 100 businesses are participating. The agreement runs for 10-years. There are four goals:
  - Goal 1: Optimise Packaging - eliminate problematic and unnecessary materials, increase recycled content, design for circularity, reduce use of virgin non-renewable resources.
  - Goal 2: Scale Reuse & Refill - build interoperable systems and citizen-friendly reuse models at scale.
  - Goal 3: Support Circular Infrastructure Investment - unlock investment in UK collection, sorting, recycling, and reprocessing capacity.
  - Goal 4: Harmonise Data - improve packaging and packaging waste data systems towards traceability and transparency.

== The Courtauld Commitment ==
The Courtauld Commitments were initiated in 2005 at an event at the Courtauld Gallery in London.

=== Courtauld Commitment one ===
During 2005-2009 the Courtauld Commitment looked particularly at food packaging, and brought food waste onto the agenda.

=== Courtauld Commitment two ===
During 2010-2012 the Courtauld Commitment sought to go beyond reducing primary packaging to include secondary and tertiary packaging, and supply chain waste. It advanced from assessing packaging by weight to considering its carbon impact.

=== Third phase ===
From 2013 to 2015, food and drink organisations worked together to reduce food, packaging and supply chain waste. Signatories to the Courtauld Commitment include industry leaders such as Tesco, Sainsbury's, Asda and big brands such as Unilever and Nestlé. The European Union praised phase one as an example of best practice. The phase three targets are:

- Reduce household food and drink waste by 5% – this represents a 9% reduction in real terms to counter the expected increase in food purchased.
- Reduce traditional grocery ingredient, product and packaging waste in the grocery supply chain by 3% – signatories will have to make an 8% reduction in real terms to counter the expected increase in production and sales.
- Improve packaging design through the supply chain to maximise recycled content as appropriate, improve recyclability and deliver product protection to reduce food waste, while ensuring there is no increase in the carbon impact of packaging – signatories will have to make a 3% reduction in real terms to counter the expected sales increase.

=== Courtauld Commitment 2025 ===
During 2015–2018, commitments sought to address the sustainability of food & drink production and consumption. The agreement looked at food waste, water and greenhouse gas emissions.

=== Courtauld Commitment 2030 ===
As of 2023, the current phase of the agreement (Courtauld Commitment 2030), encourages collaborative action across the entire UK food chain aiming for reductions in greenhouse gas emissions, food waste and water stress.

== Main business areas ==
These commitments fall within WRAP's four main business areas: food and drink waste reduction, sustainable electricals, sustainable textiles and resource management.

== International ==
WRAP is extending its work internationally, having recently worked in partnership with the United Nations Environment Programme (UNEP) and the UN's Food and Agriculture Organization (FAO) to develop a global food waste guidance tool, part of the UNEP Think.Eat.Save initiative.

== See also ==
- Circular economy
- Food waste in the United Kingdom
- ICE demolition protocol
- Publicly Available Specification
- Quality Protocol
