= Waste collection authority =

A waste collection authority (WCA) is a local authority in the UK charged with the collection of municipal waste. There are 376 WCAs in England and Wales who are responsible for collecting waste from nearly 22 million homes and some businesses. The WCA passes on the waste to the waste disposal authority that is tasked with the ultimate treatment and disposal of that waste. In England WCAs are the district councils and unitary authorities.
