= Comitology =

Process by which European Union law is modified or adjusted

Comitology in the European Union (EU) refers to a process by which EU law is implemented or adjusted by the European Commission working in conjunction with committees of national representatives (at civil service level) from the EU member states, colloquially called "comitology committees". These are chaired by the European Commission. The official term for the process is committee procedure. Comitology committees are part of the EU's broader system of committees that assist in the making, adoption, and implementation of EU laws.

The Treaty of Lisbon reconfigured comitology system, distinguishing between:

- "delegated acts" (where the Council and the Parliament empower the Commission to adjust and amend the details of legislation they have adopted, subject to them not vetoing them), and
- "implementing acts", where the Commission may adopt measures to implement the detail of the legislation (working with "comitology" committees).

This is codified in Articles 290 and 291 TFEU respectively.

== Background and history ==
All legislatures have a system of delegating detailed implementing measures to the executive. At EU level too, the European Parliament and the Council of the European Union can confer such powers on the Commission. However, the Commission must act in conjunction with committees of representatives of member states who often have the power to block the Commission and refer the matter to the Council.

It is the confusing number of committees that gave rise to the term "comitology". A report from the British House of Lords said, "There is no definitive list of comitology committees, their functions, activities and membership"; however, since the European Commission started to maintain a list, it states that "A list of 'comitology' committees [...] is published as an Annex to the Annual reports on the work of these Committees [...] as well as in the Register of Comitology." Moreover, the strongest criticism pertained to the fact that the elected European Parliament (EP) had no right to block implementing measures: only the comitology committees could do so, and if they did, the proposal was referred to Council alone, even when the initial delegation of powers was through an act adopted jointly by both Parliament and Council under the co-decision procedure. Parliament argued that the system lacked transparency and democratic control.

After years of complaint by Parliament, a significant reform placing Parliament and Council on an equal footing was to be introduced by the Constitutional Treaty. Since the latter did not get ratified, the Parliament insisted that the envisaged changes be introduced through secondary law. An agreement was reached in 2006 and a new procedure, the regulatory procedure with scrutiny, was introduced, to be used when non-essential elements of EU legislation adopted under the co-decision procedure required amendment or supplementation.

The procedure gives Parliament and Council a period (normally of three months) to examine proposals that have been through a comitology committee. If Parliament objects to a proposal, the Commission cannot enact it. Instead, the Commission can either make a new proposal, taking account of the reasons for the objection (in which case the clock is re-set and Parliament can again block), or it can propose new legislation to Parliament and Council under the legislative co-decision procedure.

The new procedure applies whenever Council and Parliament, under co-decision on the basic legislation, choose to confer powers on the Commission to adopt implementing measures of general scope that can be described as "quasi-legislative" in nature (delegated legislation). It does not apply to administrative or purely executive decisions. The system does not apply when the original legislation is not co-decision legislation. Then, the old comitology procedures (see below) can still apply.

=== First comitology decision ===
The comitology system was initially not foreseen under the EEC Treaty. The Single European Act introduced a legal basis for the first time and instructed the Council to adopt a Decision setting out the different procedures. This was the first Comitology decision of 1987.

=== Second comitology decision ===
The Parliament had also pressed for more transparency in the comitology system. On 28 June 1999 it secured the Council's agreement in a Council of the European Union decision on procedures for the exercise of implementing powers conferred on the Commission (Decision 1999/468/EC, "the Comitology Decision"), which outlines "advisory", "management", regulatory" and "safeguard" procedures (Articles 3 to 6 respectively).

Article 7 paragraph 5 of the Comitology Decision states that references of the documents transmitted to the Parliament should be made available to the public. The Commission was, therefore, obliged to create a register of Comitology documents and a web-based repository to the register which enables the user to obtain direct access to certain documents which also contains a link for requesting the document, if it is not made public in the repository (in accordance with the rules of the Regulation No. 1049/2001 of the European Parliament and of the Council of 30 May 2001).

The register in general contains the following types of documents:

- agendas of committee meetings,
- draft implementing measures,
- summary records of committee meetings,
- voting results of opinions delivered by a committee.

=== Comitology regulation ===
A new regulation on comitology, Regulation No 182/2011, was adopted pursuant to Article 291 (3) TFEU, and has been in force since 1 March 2011. This regulation lays down "the rules and general principles concerning mechanisms for control by Member States of the Commission's exercise of implementing powers".

== Types of committee ==
Under the second comitology decision of 1999 (amended in 2006) there were four categories of committee: Advisory, Management, Regulatory and, under the procedure agreed in 2006, Regulatory with Scrutiny. Advisory committees give opinions which the Commission must take account of, but it retains the power of decision. Management committees can block a proposed Commission measure by a qualified majority. A Regulatory committee needs a qualified majority to approve a proposed Commission measure. Measures not adopted are referred to the Council for a decision (or Council and Parliament under the new Regulatory committee with Scrutiny, where opposition from either will block the proposed measure).

The Comitology regulation has only retained the advisory procedure, and replaced the management and regulatory procedures with the examination procedure. Under the Lisbon Treaty, the scenarios in which the regulatory procedure with scrutiny applied are now covered by the delegated act foreseen in Article 290 TFEU. As of 2021 the regulatory procedure with scrutiny still exists however and is in the process of being phased out.

== Democratic legitimacy ==
As noted above, the European Parliament has long had a problem with the lack of transparency of comitology committees, stemming mainly from the fact that Members of the European Parliament (MEPs) are excluded from the comitology process. A broader concern has been voiced about the public accountability of comitology. As sites of European governance which produce a vast amount of binding legislation, comitology's opaque mode of operation, unclear membership, and closed debate style has been the subject of criticism from both academics and practitioners.

== See also ==
- Transparency (behavior)
