= Automated vacuum collection =

Waste collection system

An automated vacuum waste collection system, also known as pneumatic refuse collection, or automated vacuum collection (AVAC), transports waste at high speeds through underground pneumatic tubes to a collection station where the waste is compacted and sealed in containers. Full containers are transported away to be emptied. The AVAC system helps facilitate the separation and recycling of waste material.

The process begins by disposing of trash into intake hatches, also known as portholes, which are usually specialized for waste, recycling, or compost. Portholes are often located in public areas, and on private property where the owner has opted in. Through the use of air pressure differentials created by large industrial fans, waste is pulled into an underground pipeline system; this process is facilitated by the use of porthole sensors that indicate when the trash needs to be emptied and help ensure that only one type of waste material travels through the pipe at a time. The pipelines converge in a central processing facility which directs the waste to the appropriate containers so it could be transported to its final location, such as a landfill or composting plant.

== History ==
The first system was created in Sweden in the 1960s, designed by the Swedish corporation Envac AB (formerly known as Centralsug AB). The first installation was in 1961 at Sollefteå Hospital. The first vacuum system for household waste, was installed in the new residential district of Ör-Hallonbergen, Sweden in 1965.

== Overview ==
Pneumatic waste collection systems provide a number of environmental benefits. These systems can decrease emissions from transit of waste by up to 90%. Systems in Europe provide separate outlets for food, recycling, and non-recycling, making waste separation and recycling more efficient. Some systems require household ID cards to use, and limit the amount of non-recyclable waste allowed per month, issuing a tax if the threshold is crossed. In Bergen, Norway, this system resulted in a 29% increase in plastic recycling, and an 85% decrease in non-recyclable waste, plus a $2 million saving in waste collection costs.

These systems also decrease the risk of fire and prevent animals from accessing waste.

Issues with budgeting and logistics have prevented a more widespread adoption of these systems. Upfront costs can reach into the hundreds of millions, and it is difficult to build the system into existing infrastructure. Pneumatic waste collection is optimal for high density development areas rather than existing urban areas. Maintenance may be difficult, and damage or blockages from inappropriate use requires engineers to enter the pipes to fix them.

== Current systems ==
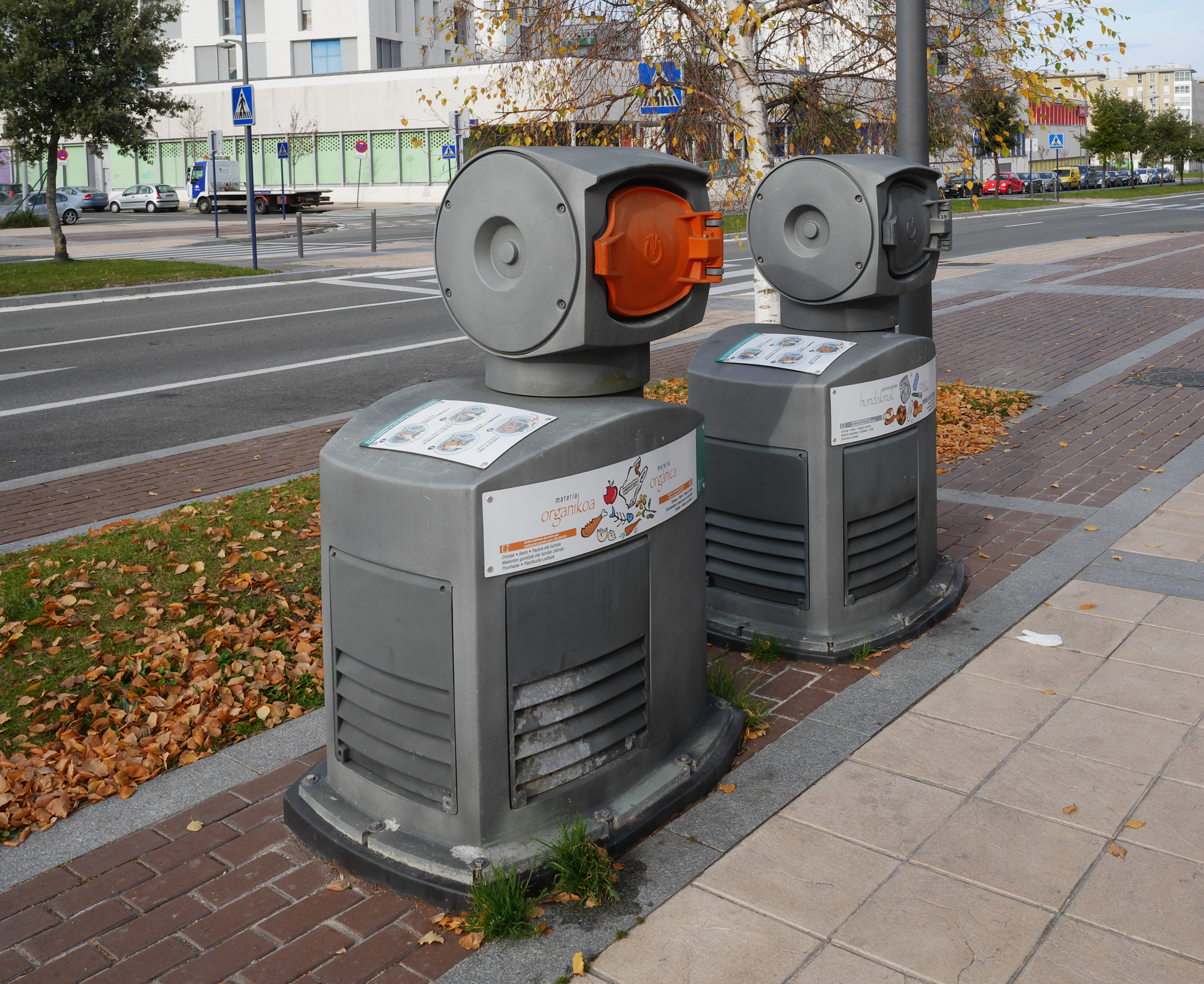
Pneumatic refuse collection in Vitoria-Gasteiz, Basque Country, Northern Spain

As of 2018, there are close to a thousand systems in operation all over the world - in China, South East Asia, South Korea, the Middle East, the United States, Australia, and Europe.

=== United States ===
In the U.S., this type of system is installed in several places, but the most well known are built by AVAC and located in the Magic Kingdom in Disney World, Orlando, Florida; and Roosevelt Island in New York City. The Magic Kingdom uses special Disney utility corridors.

The Roosevelt Island system, serving nearly 10,000 people, is said to be the largest in the United States and the only system in the U.S. in a residential complex.

=== Europe ===
Notable examples in Europe include Copenhagen, Barcelona, London, and Stockholm, and Leganés and Barakaldo in Spain.

An automated vacuum collection system called Rööri started operation in early 2014 in the new Jätkäsaari residential neighbourhood of Helsinki, Finland. All housing cooperatives and other apartment buildings were obliged to join the network. Each building has a collection point with up to five wastebins or tubes, each for different types of waste and with the capacity to store several parcels of waste. The underground tube network acts like a packet switched telecommunication network, transporting one kind of waste at a time. Once an input bin is filled, or capacity is available, it is transferred to the central collection site and combined with the same class of waste.

Also in Finland, in the suburb of Vuores in the city of Tampere, a vacuum collection system was included in a new suburban development planned for 13,000 inhabitants. It has a total of 124 collection points, 368 waste inlets, and 13 km of pipe. The system's daily collection capacity for dry waste, biowaste, paper, and recyclable cardboard comes to a combined total of 13 tonnes, and it became operational in 2012.

In Bergen, Norway, a system covers most of the city center.

=== Israel ===
As of 2018, in Israel there are 5 systems - 2 operational in Yavne and Ra'anana, and 3 planned in Bat Yam, Tel Aviv and Rishon LeZion. In a techno-economic analysis conducted by the Ministry of Environmental Protection, it was found that the cost of intra-urban treating in pneumatic collection in neighborhoods with multiple units and under funding contractors is 25% lower in comparison to conventional methods, and this is without internalizing the external benefits arising from it (value of time and pollution). It was also found that for neighborhoods with higher buildings (with the same number of housing units), the cost of a pneumatic system was even cheaper (at least approximately 20%)

In 2006, Yavne municipality issued a tender for the establishment of a pneumatic evacuation of household waste for the residential project "Green Neighborhood" which comprises 4,700 household units in around 200 buildings. In September 2012, the system began operating in residential use. In February 2014, the municipality began replacing the neighborhood's street trash cans with pneumatic cans. Now there are also around 30 waste collection points in public areas - parks, schools and the streets. The system is also planned to be connected to all future neighborhoods and serve 10,660 house units.

In May 2012, Ra'anana municipality approved the residential project "Neve Zemer" which is planned to include around 3,550 housing units in around 235 buildings with a pneumatic evacuation system of household waste. The pneumatic evacuation system became operational in 2018.

Bat Yam municipality published in 2017 a tender for planning, construction, and operation of pneumatic evacuation system for 5,000 residential neighborhood units (approximately 60 high-rise buildings) and 2,000 hotel rooms.

In 2009, Tel Aviv municipality's head of the city's construction and infrastructure manager, Dr. Benny Maor, said the city planned to install a pneumatic evacuation system in planned northwestern neighborhoods. In 2013, the municipality requested the preparation of a plan for a pneumatic evacuation system as a condition for a building permit in part of a development plan of 11,446 square meters land plots located in Rothschild Boulevard and Ahad Ha'am streets.

=== Australia ===
In 2020, the first system in Australia became operational in Maroochydore, Queensland. The system was installed as part of the city center development project - the largest greenfield central business district development in the country.

== Planned systems ==
=== North America ===
A system is planned for a new City Center development in Carmel, Indiana. It would service condominiums, businesses, and a hotel.

In March 2015, the city of Montreal abandoned its $3 million investment in a plan to install an automated vacuum collection system in the Quartier des Spectacles entertainment district.

Another installation is planned for Hudson Yards, Manhattan.

=== Middle East ===
The world's largest AWCS is being built by MetroTaifun in the vicinity of Islam's holiest mosque in Mecca, Saudi Arabia, to keep trash collection out of sight. During the Ramadan and Hajj, 600 tonnes (or 4,500 cubic meters) of waste is generated each day; it will be collected at 74 waste feeding points spread out across the area and then transferred via a 20-kilometre pipe network to a central collection point.

== See also ==
- Pneumatic tube
- Dustpan
- Central vacuum cleaner
- Transfer station
- Waste collection vehicle
- Waste collection
- Waste collector
