= Technical Guidance WM2 =

Hazardous waste guidance in the United Kingdom

Technical Guidance WM2: Hazardous Waste: Interpretation of the definition and classification of hazardous waste is a guidance document developed and jointly published by the English Environment Agency, Natural Resources Wales, Scottish Environment Protection Agency and the Northern Ireland Environment Agency to provide guidance on the assessment and classification of hazardous waste based on the revised Waste Framework Directive definition of hazardous waste. Waste producers, consultants, contractors and waste management companies use the guidance to a) identify the correct waste code for their waste and b) determine whether the waste is hazardous or not based on its chemical composition.

== Regulatory framework ==
The revised Waste Framework Directive (rWFD) is the primary legislative framework for the collection, transport, recovery and disposal of waste across Europe. It uses a waste hierarchy to define a priority order for waste prevention, legislation and policy. WM2 follows the European wide definition of hazardous waste defined by the rWFD as a waste which displays one or more of the fifteen hazard properties listed in Annex III of the rWFD.

- H1 Explosive
- H2 Oxidising
- H3 Flammable
- H4 Irritant
- H5 Harmful
- H6 Toxic
- H7 Carcinogenic
- H8 Corrosive
- H9 Infectious
- H10 Toxic for reproduction
- H11 Mutagenic
- H12 Waste which releases toxic or very toxic gases in contact with water, air or acid
- H13 Sensitizing
- H14 Ecotoxic
- H15 Waste capable by any means, after disposal, of yielding another substance, e..g. a leachate, which possesses any of the characteristics above.

Dangerous substances are substances that possess one or more of the 68 Risk Phrases described in the Dangerous Substances Directive (67/548/EEC). For example:

- R7 – may cause fire
- R23 – toxic by inhalation
- R38 – irritating to the skin
- R45 – may cause cancer
- R52 – harmful to aquatic organisms

The rWFD also refers to the list of wastes known as the European Waste Catalogue (EWC). The EWC contains 846, six digit waste codes arranged in 20 chapters, where each chapter is based on a generic industry or process that generated the waste or upon the type of waste. The EWC differentiates between hazardous and non-hazardous by identifying hazardous waste entries with an asterisk. Examples of a hazardous entry and its equivalent non-hazardous entry from "Chapter 17 Construction and Demolition Wastes (including excavated soil from contaminated sites)" are:

- 17 05 03* soil and stones containing dangerous substances
- 17 05 04 soil and stones other than those mentioned in 17 05 03

with the * indicating the hazardous entry.

Regulation (EC) No 1272/2008, the Classification, Labelling and Packaging of Substances Regulation (CLP Regulation) was published in December 2008. This directly acting regulation amends and repeals both the Dangerous Substances Directive (67/548/EEC) and the Dangerous Preparations Directive (1999/45/EC) and amends part of the REACH regulation (Registration, Evaluation, Authorisation and Restriction of Chemicals Regulation (EC) No 1907/2006). Depending on whether you are dealing with substances or mixtures (preparations), these changes take place between 2009 and 2015. [This also means that the CHIP 4 Regulation 2009 will need to be repealed in 2015 as it enacts the two European directives mentioned above.]

Of particular relevance to waste classification and WM2 is Table 3.2 of Annex VI of the CLP. This table is the primary data source for the risk phrases and other attributes for more than 4000 substances.

Note that since the CLP Regulation was first published, it has been amended by six Adaptations to Technical Progress (ATPs). These amendments have particular impact on the substance data managed by Table 3.2.

== Hazardous waste assessment ==
WM2 is a detailed technical guide for the classification and assessment of wastes that may or may not be hazardous. It provides a step by step process to determine whether a waste is hazardous or not along with more detailed guidance when assessing the chemical analysis (composition) of the waste. The basic steps are:

Step 1: Is the waste "directive waste" or required to be assessed due to domestic legislative provision?

Step 2: How is the waste coded and classified in the LoW?

Step 3: Are the substances in the waste known or can they be determined?

Step 4: Are there dangerous substances in the waste?

Step 5: Does the waste possess any of the hazard properties H1 to H15?

Waste containing dangerous substances may be hazardous if the concentrations of those substances are above specified thresholds. This can be checked by

- Physical testing such as determining the flashpoint
- Comparing the concentration of substances in the waste with the threshold values of the substance's risk phrases.

The various calculations required for assessing the different hazard properties are detailed in Appendix C of WM2; this appendix contains 15 separate sections, one for each hazard property.

While classifications can be done by hand or via custom built spreadsheets, these approaches are time consuming, difficult to maintain and to audit. The introduction of commercial software in 2010 allowed users to concentrate on what is in the waste rather than how to carry out the calculations.

== Commercial software ==
- Hazwasteonline is a Software as a service resource, accessed over the internet using any modern browser. The software contains all twenty chapters of the EWC and all four thousand plus substances from Table 3.2 of the CLP Regulation. Users can also add their own substances, design templates to suit different waste streams, cut-n-paste from spreadsheets and generate detailed (auditable), PDF-based classification reports that can be submitted to waste management companies. The software also allows users to share their data and supporting documents with other parties, all on-line; meaning that the data are entered once and then re-used.

== Waste acceptance criteria ==
After the waste has been classified as either hazardous or non hazardous, it can then be assessed with respect to disposal. One of the routes for disposal is to landfill.

Under the Landfill Directive (1999/31/EC), landfills are classified according to whether they can accept hazardous, non-hazardous or inert wastes and wastes can only be accepted at a landfill if they meet the waste acceptance criteria (WAC) for that class of landfill.

To assess against a landfill's WAC, representative samples of the waste are sent to a laboratory for WAC testing (leachate tests). The analysis is needed to demonstrate that as a hazardous waste, or a stable, non reactive hazardous waste, or an inert waste, any load of waste meets the appropriate landfill waste acceptance criteria. The landfill WAC are maximum limits which must not be exceeded and should be viewed as treatment specifications for landfill.
