= Animal By-Products Regulations =

The European Union's Animal By-Products Regulations (Regulation No 1069/2009) allows for the treatment of some animal by-products in composting and biogas plants (anaerobic digesters). The following article describes procedures required to allow solid outputs (compost, digestate) from composting plants and anaerobic digesters onto land in the United Kingdom.

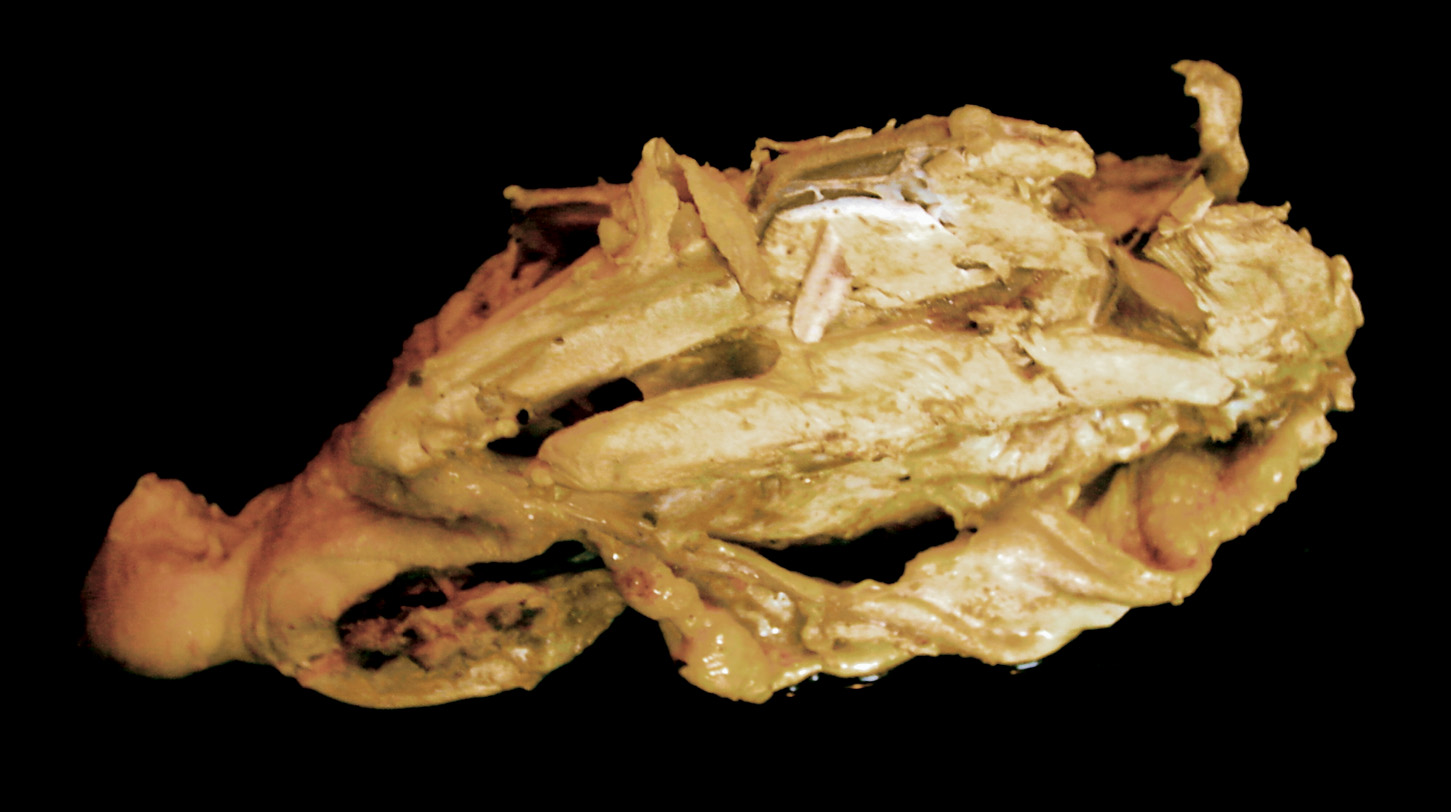
A chicken carcass

== Categories of Animal By-Products ==
- Category 1: Very high risk
- Category 2: High risk
- Category 3: Low risk

=== Category 1 ===
- BSE (Bovine spongiform encephalopathy) carcasses and suspects
- Specified Risk Material
- Catering waste from international transport

Must all be destroyed, not for use in composting or biogas plants

=== Category 2 ===
- Condemned meat
- Manure and gut contents

Can be used in composting and biogas plants after rendering (133C, 3 bar pressure) Manure and gut contents only can be used after pretreatment

=== Category 3 ===
- Catering waste from households, restaurants
- Former food
- Much slaughter house waste e.g. waste blood & feathers

Can be used in composting and biogas plants without pretreatment

== Treatment Standards ==
=== Composting ===
Closed reactor

- Maximum particle size 40cm, minimum temperature 60C, minimum time at that temperature 2 days
- Maximum Particle size 6cm, minimum temperature 70C, minimum time at that temperature 1 hour

Housed windrow

- Particle size 40cm, minimum temperature 60C, minimum time at that temperature 8 days

=== Biogas plants ===
- Maximum particle size 5cm, minimum temperature 57C, minimum time at that temperature 5 hours
- Maximum particle size 6cm, minimum temperature 70C, minimum time at that temperature 1 hour

== See also ==
- Anaerobic digestion
- Biodegradable waste
- Composting
- Pasteurization
