= Waste disposal authority =

Waste disposal authorities (WDA) were established in the United Kingdom following the Environmental Protection Act 1990. WDAs are in charge of the use of funds from Council Tax to facilitate the disposal of municipal waste. WDAs must manage waste which is collected by local councils. In the case of unitary authorities waste disposal authorities are the same as the waste collection authority. WDAs are responsible for developing and implementing plans to deal with municipal waste.

== See also ==
- Greater Manchester Waste Disposal Authority
- Merseyside Waste Disposal Authority
- Waste authorities in Greater London
