= Industrial Emissions Directive =

EU regulation of pollution from power plants etc

Directive 2010/75/EU
- European Union directive
- Title: Industrial Emissions Directive
- Made by: European Parliament & Council
- Made under: Article 175(1)
- Journal reference: OJL 334, 12 December 2010, pp. 17–119

History
- Date made: 24 November 2010
- Entry into force: 6 January 2011
- Implementation date: 7 January 2013

Other legislation
- Replaces: 78/176/EEC, 82/883/EEC, 92/112/EEC, 1999/13/EC, 2000/76/EC, 2008/1/EC, and 2001/80/EC
- Amended by: Directive (EU) 2024/1785

The Industrial Emissions Directive (IED), formally Directive 2010/75/EU on industrial and livestock rearing emissions (integrated pollution prevention and control), is a European Union directive regulating pollution from industrial activities and intensive livestock rearing. It establishes rules for preventing or reducing emissions into air, water and land and for limiting waste generation.

The directive uses an integrated permitting system based on best available techniques (BAT), which are used to establish environmental requirements for installations covered by the legislation.

Directive 2010/75/EU was substantially amended by Directive (EU) 2024/1785, which entered into force on 4 August 2024. The revised legislation expanded the directive's scope and introduced additional requirements relating to resource efficiency, environmental performance, public access to information and enforcement.

== Rationale ==
The European Commission undertook a 2-year review with all stakeholders to examine how the legislation on industrial emissions could be improved to offer a high level of protection for the environment and human health while simplifying the existing legislation and cutting unnecessary administrative costs. Throughout Europe there is high acceptance that industrial emissions are the leading cause of pollution in Europe. As well there is high support for a system where the polluter will pay under a Polluter pays principle.

The IED is intended to provide significant improvement on the interaction between the previous seven directives (including the Waste Incineration Directive) which it replaces. It also strengthens, in several instances, some provisions in previous directives, for example the Large Combustion Plant Directive.

== 2024 revision ==
Directive (EU) 2024/1785 amended the Industrial Emissions Directive in 2024. The amendment entered into force on 4 August 2024, and EU Member States were required to transpose it into national law by 1 July 2026.

The revision expanded the scope of the directive to include additional industrial activities. These include large-scale battery manufacturing and the industrial-scale extraction and on-site treatment of specified metallic ores. It also lowered the thresholds at which certain intensive pig and poultry farms fall within the legislation. Cattle farming was not included, although the European Commission is required to assess whether further measures addressing livestock emissions, particularly from cattle, are needed.

The revised directive strengthened requirements relating to emission limits and the use of best available techniques. Permits may also include environmental performance requirements concerning areas such as water, energy and material use. The legislation introduced additional provisions on public access to permit information, participation in permitting decisions and access to remedies.

For livestock farms, the revised legislation provides for a simplified regulatory system based on registration rather than the permitting system used for large industrial installations. The new requirements for affected farms are being introduced progressively, beginning with the largest farms from 2030.

== Exemptions ==
The directive allows competent authorities to grant derogations from certain emissions requirements in specified circumstances, including where achieving the levels associated with best available techniques would lead to disproportionately higher costs compared with the environmental benefits. The 2024 revision introduced stricter conditions for the granting of derogations and requires the reasons for a derogation to be made publicly available.

== Criticism ==
The treatment of livestock farming under the 2024 revision was contested during the legislative process. Farming organisations and some political groups opposed extending the directive to a larger number of farms, arguing that the proposed requirements would place an excessive regulatory burden on the sector.

Environmental organisations, by contrast, criticised the narrowing of the proposal during negotiations, including the exclusion of cattle farms and the higher thresholds adopted for pig and poultry farms.

The final rules were estimated to cover around 30% of the EU's largest industrial pig and poultry farms.
