= Project Wasteless =

National food waste prevention programme in Europe

Project Wasteless is the national level food waste prevention programme of Hungary, part of the European and global food loss and food waste prevention initiative, a member organisation of the EU Platform on Food Losses and Food Waste. Project Wasteless was launched by the National Food Chain Safety Office in 2016 with the co-funding of the EU LIFE Framework. In 2023 Project Wasteless was identified as a European good practice by the European Commission, based on the findings of the European Consumer Food Waste Forum, and also received the EU LIFE Award, as one of the top 3 environmental protection projects in Europe.

== History ==
The idea of Project Wasteless was founded by Gyula Kasza and Barbara Szabó-Bódi in 2015. In 2016 their project proposal received a 4-year co-funding by the European LIFE Framework, which helped the development of the programme within the National Food Chain Safety Office. 'Wasteless' is a dierect translation of the Hungarian phrase 'Maradék nélkül', the programme's original title.

The programme received inspiration from the UK based Love Food, Hate Waste campaign, organised by WRAP, and the Dutch United Against Food Waste initiative, as well as the work of Wageningen University & Research.

In 2018, the team of Project Wasteless was invited by the European Commission to host the European LIFE Food Waste Platform Meeting ‘Effective Solutions for Prevention and Treatment’ with 120 international participants that took place in Budapest on 8-9th of October. The participants were welcomed by Karmenu Vella, Commissioner for Maritime Affairs and Fisheries and by Vytenis Andriukaitis, Commissioner for Health & Food Safety.

In 2019, the coordinator of Project Wasteless, Gyula Kasza was invited to represent Hungary in the EU Platform on Food Losses and Food Waste. The Joint Research Centre, in collaboration with the Directorate-General for Health and Food Safety, has set up a multi-disciplinary forum to assess consumer food waste prevention initiatives, called European Consumer Food Waste Forum, in which Gyula Kasza was invited as a core expert, and one year later he was invited to be one of the three members of the Knowledge Committee for the European Citizens' Panel on Food Waste, organised by the European Commission with the intention of gathering citizens' insights on how to step up action to reduce food waste in the EU.

From 2020, Project Wasteless received co-funding from the Ministry of Agriculture and European projects including Horizon Europe, Single Market Programme (HaDEA) and Interreg Europe.

In 2023 the Hungarian Government issued a regulation on biowaste, in which it identified Project Wasteless as the national food waste prevention programme of Hungary.

In 2023, Wasteless Foundation, a non-profit organisation was founded to provide operational support for Project Wasteless through research activities and international collaboration. In 2024, Wasteless Foundation become a member of the European Food Information Council.

== Main achievements ==
- Project Wasteless measures household food waste in Hungary since 2016, and findings indicate a 9% decrease in the amount of total food waste (from 68.0 to 62.0 kg) and a 22% decrease in the amount of avoidable food waste (from 33.1 to 25.8 kg).
- The total reach of the awareness raising programme is estimated to exceed 10 times per average citizen in Hungary since 2016.
- The total direct (personal) reach of the educational programme is nearly 35,000 children and young adults and almost 1900 teachers.
