= Source-separated organics =

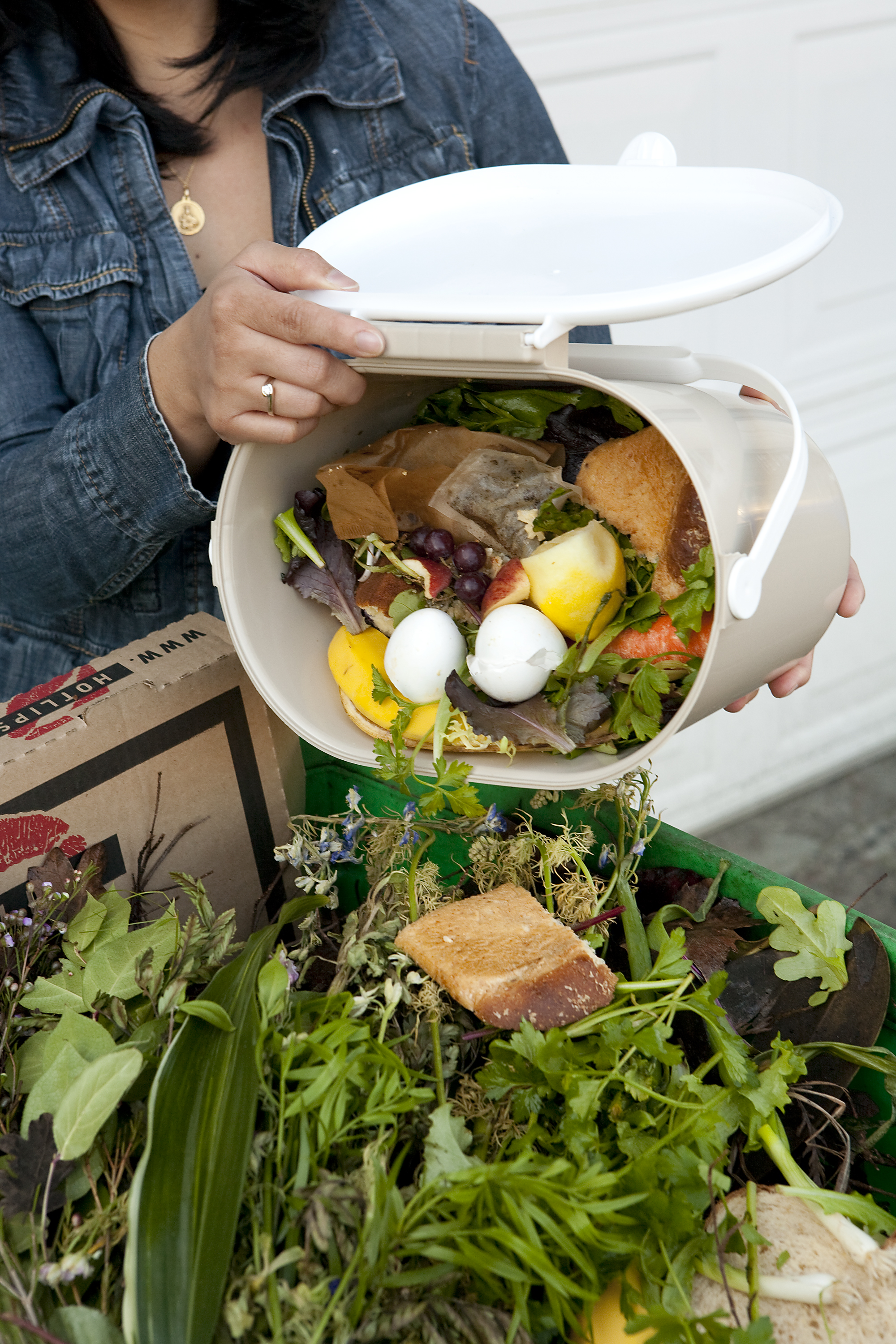
A resident adds kitchen food scraps to yard debris in a roll cart as part of the community's source separated organics (SSO) program.

Source-separated organics (SSO) is the system by which waste generators segregate compostable materials from other waste streams at the source for separate collection.

== Types of materials ==
Organic materials, such as yard trimmings, food scraps, wood waste, and paper and paperboard products, typically make up about one-third (by weight) of the municipal solid waste stream. SSO programs depend on the composition of local waste stream, acceptance specifications for the organics processing facility, and collection methods. The types of organic materials collected include:

- Yard and landscaping debris: floral trimmings, tree trimmings, leaves, grass, brush, and weeds
- Food waste: organic residues generated by the handling, storage, sale, preparation, cooking, and serving of foods, including fruits, vegetables, meat, poultry, seafood, shellfish, bones, rice, beans, pasta, bakery items, cheese, eggshells, and coffee grounds
- Paper fibers: waxed cardboard, napkins, paper towels, uncoated paper plates, tea bags, coffee filters, wooden crates, and greasy pizza boxes
- Wood waste: urban wood waste, woody debris from suburban land clearing, and rural forestry residuals

== Programs ==
SSO programs have been launched in a wide range of venues, including single-family residential units, commercial businesses, events, food processors, schools, hospitals, and airports. The U.S. Environmental Protection Agency (EPA) has assembled tools and resources for food waste management to assist communities interested in launching their own food waste reduction and collection efforts. SSO materials are typically collected in wet-strength paper bags, unlined plastic bins, or compostable film-plastic liners that meet ASTM 6400 standards.

== Benefits ==
The organic fraction of the waste stream is increasingly viewed as a resource. The resulting products – renewable energy and compost – benefit the environment: reduce greenhouse gas emissions; reduce dependency on foreign energy imports; increase the nutrient composition of our soils; reduce the amount of waste going to landfills; reduce the amount of wet, sloppy waste going to other methods of disposal; reduce the leachate associated with stormwater management at landfills; reduce the greenhouse gas emissions from uncontrolled landfill operations; improve erosion and stormwater control through biofiltration (Schwab, 2000).

== Barriers to adoption ==
Communities and businesses that want to implement SSO programs face a few challenges. First, they need participation at the source of their organic waste generation. Second, they need a hauler willing to collect the organic waste. Third, they need a composting facility permitted to process the material. These challenges have been overcome by many successful SSO programs. Tactics for addressing barriers to adoption include creating outreach and education materials, forging partnerships between local businesses to share fixed collection costs, and creating incentives for organic diversion through regulated tip fees for solid waste and organics.

== Processing ==
Organic materials collected in SSO programs typically get delivered to composting facilities where the waste is turned into nutrient-rich soil amendments known as compost. Organic feedstock can also be delivered to anaerobic digestion facilities that produce biogas, a source of renewable energy. The resulting biogas (methane) can then be used for cogeneration (electricity and heat preferably on or close to the site of production) and can be used in gas combustion engines or turbines. With further upgrading to synthetic natural gas it can be injected into the natural gas network or further refined to hydrogen for use in stationary cogeneration fuel cells.

== See also ==
- Anaerobic digestion
- Biodegradable waste
- Biogas
- Bioplastics
- Food waste
- Materials recovery facility
- Municipal solid waste
- Recycling
- Waste management
