= Love Food, Hate Waste =

Charitable campaign to reduce food waste

Love Food Hate Waste is a food waste reduction campaign launched by the Waste & Resources Action Programme (WRAP) in 2007, aimed at reducing food waste in the United Kingdom. By 2009, the campaign said it had helped almost two million households reduce their food waste, amounting to savings of almost £300 million and stopping 137,000 tonnes of waste from being wasted. The campaign has since spread internationally, including to Australia, New Zealand and Canada.

WRAP research published in the 2020s estimates that UK households throw away around 4.4 million tonnes of edible food a year, worth roughly £17.5 billion and responsible for about 16 million tonnes of greenhouse gas emissions - equivalent to around £1,000 of wasted food annually for a family of four. Since 2021, WRAP has run Food Waste Action Week, an annual flagship campaign under the Love Food Hate Waste brand, bringing together UK and international governments, retailers, manufacturers, NGOs and community groups to promote practical steps for cutting household food waste. A WRAP citizen survey found recognition of the Love Food Hate Waste logo had grown to around 31% of the UK public by the early 2020s, roughly double the level recorded in November 2018.

== Food Waste Action Week ==
Each Food Waste Action Week has focused on a different theme:

- 2024 – "Choose What You'll Use", encouraging shoppers to buy loose fruit and vegetables rather than pre-packaged produce, run in partnership with 162 organisations across 12 countries.
- 2025 – continued the "Choose What You'll Use" theme, with WRAP calling for a packaging ban on 21 commonly sold fruit and vegetable items, which it estimated could prevent around 100,000 tonnes of edible produce and 13,000 tonnes of plastic film from being wasted annually.
- 2026 – ran 9–15 March under the theme "Make Your Food Go Fuuuuuuuurther: for your pocket, for our planet", focused on preventing waste, using up leftovers, and recycling food scraps that cannot be eaten.

== Household Food Management Survey ==
WRAP publishes an annual Household Food Management Survey tracking self-reported household food waste. The 2025 survey found a 21% increase in waste of four key monitored items (bread, milk, potatoes and chicken) compared with the previous measure, the fourth-highest level recorded since 2018; 27% of respondents were classified as "higher" food wasters, rising to 33% among 18–44 year-olds.

== End of use-by date ==
In relation to the Love Food Hate Waste campaign, UK minister Hilary Benn announced plans to end the use of use-by dates as he sees them as a major cause of food waste. There are plans to replace the use-by date with new technologies such as a time temperature indicator.
