= Swedish Institute for Food and Biotechnology =

Swedish research institute

The Swedish Institute for Food and Biotechnology (SIK) is an industrial research institute owned by SP Technical Research Institute of Sweden. As of 2017, the Swedish Institute for Food and Biotechnology has changed its name to The Food and Bioscience unit.
