= Post-harvest losses (grains) =

Ways in which grain losses can occur and ways of addressing problems

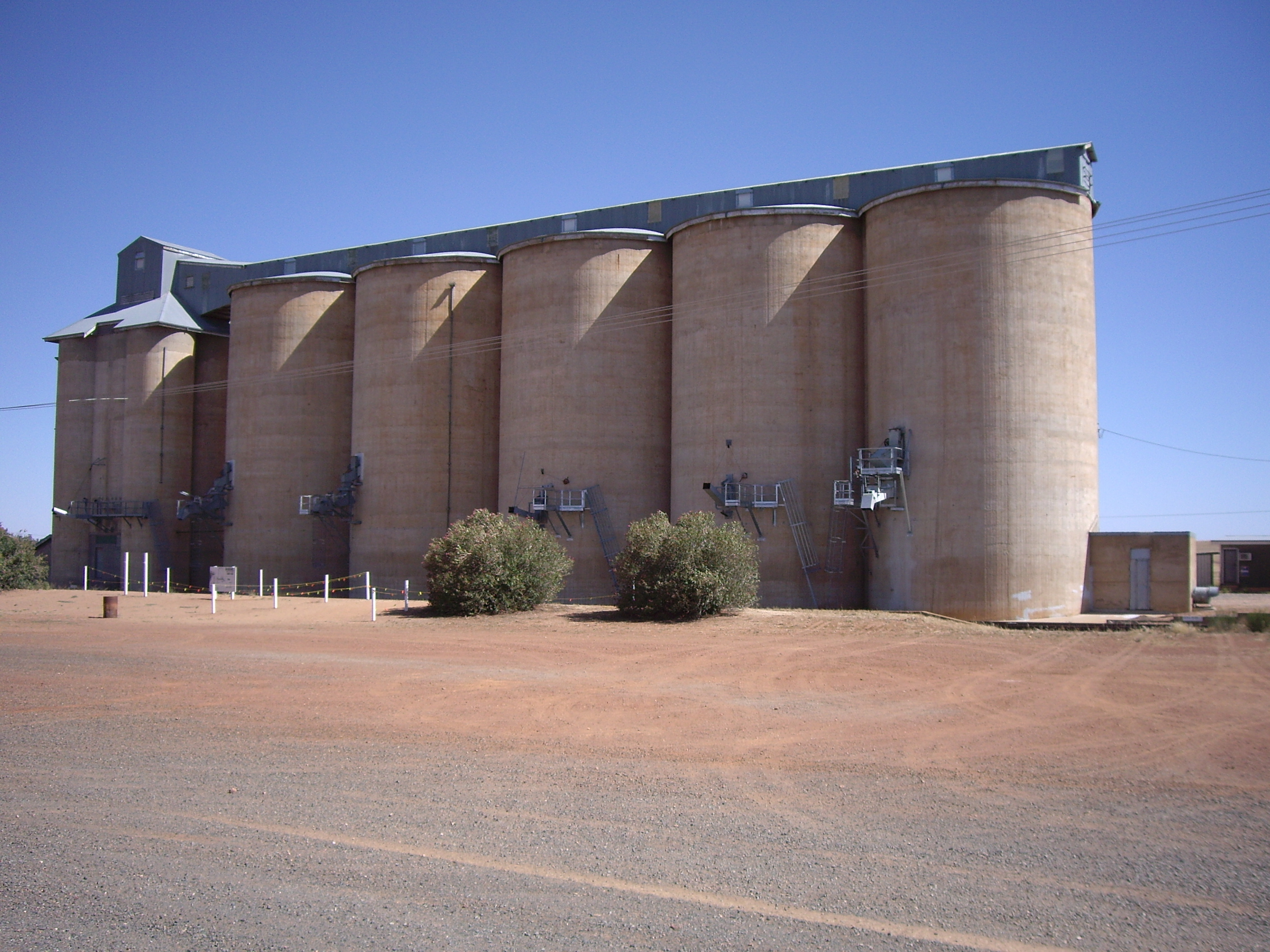
Grain silos in Australia

Grains may be lost in the pre-harvest, harvest, and post-harvest stages. Pre-harvest losses occur before the process of harvesting begins, and may be due to insects, weeds, and rusts. Harvest losses occur between the beginning and completion of harvesting, and are primarily caused by losses due to shattering. Post-harvest losses occur between harvest and the moment of human consumption. They include on-farm losses, such as when grain is threshed, winnowed, and dried. Other on-farm losses include inadequate harvesting time, climatic conditions, practices applied at harvest and handling, and challenges in marketing produce. Significant losses are caused by inadequate storage conditions as well as decisions made at earlier stages of the supply chain, including transportation, storage, and processing, which predispose products to a shorter shelf life.

Important in many developing countries, particularly in Africa, are on-farm losses during storage, when the grain is being stored for auto-consumption or while the farmer awaits a selling opportunity or a rise in prices.

== Potential for loss ==
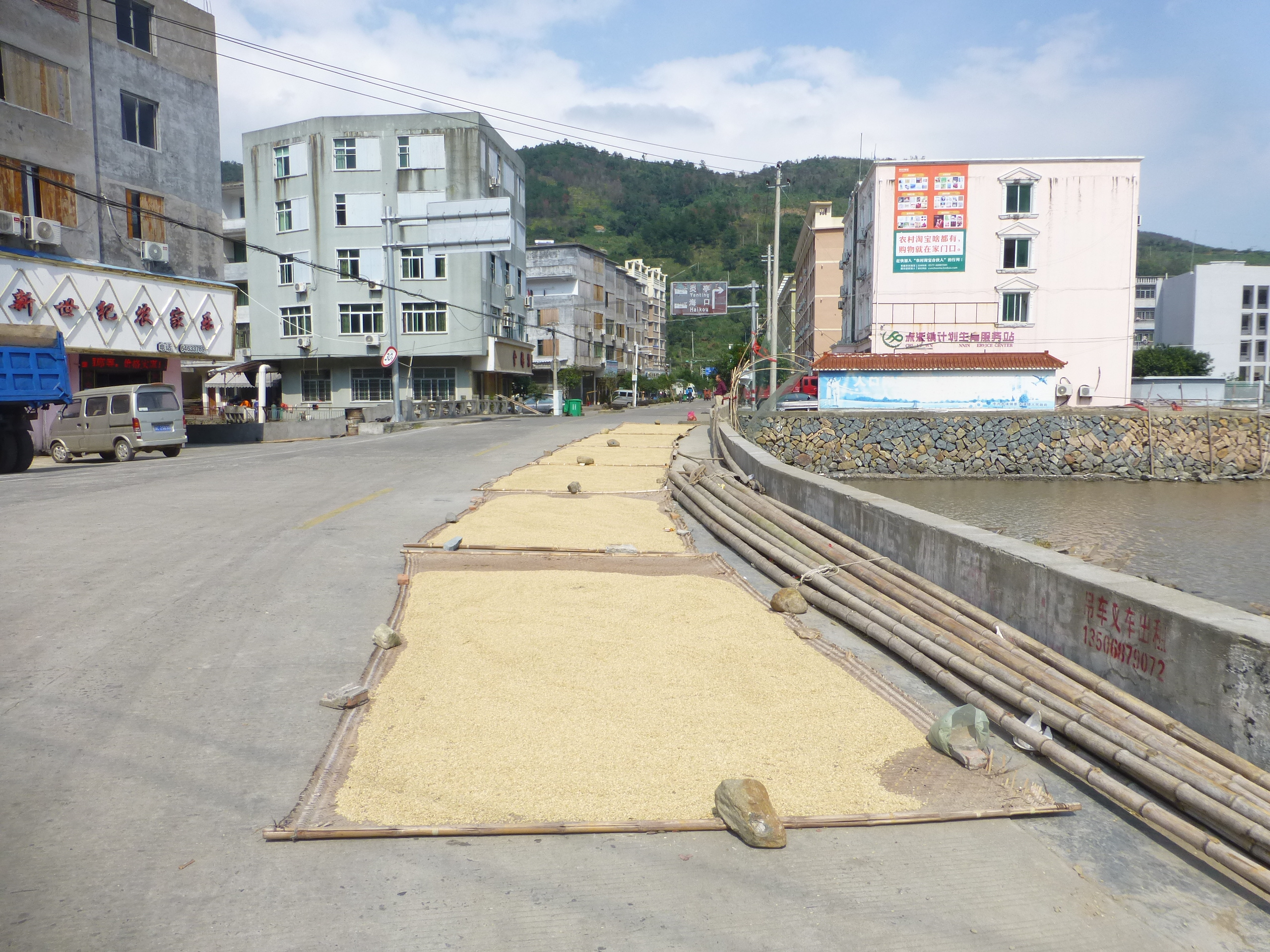
Grain being dried on a bamboo mat on a roadway in Chuxi Town, Cangnan County, Zhejiang, China. Drying rice in the open air creates possibilities for losses to birds.

There is potential for loss throughout the grain harvesting and agricultural marketing chains. During stripping of maize grain from the cob, known as shelling, losses can occur when mechanical shelling is not followed up by hand-stripping of the grains that are missed. Certain shellers can damage the grain, making insect penetration easier. For crops other than maize, threshing losses occur as a result of spillage, incomplete removal of the grain or by damage to grain during the threshing. They can also occur after threshing due to poor separation of grain from the chaff during cleaning or winnowing. Incomplete threshing usually occurs in regions with high labour costs, particularly at harvest time, when labour is too scarce and expensive to justify hand-stripping after an initial mechanical thresh. Certain mechanical threshers are designed only for dry grain.

A wet season's paddy harvest may clog the screens and grain will be lost. Cleaning is essential before milling. On the farm, cleaning is usually a combination of winnowing and removal by hand of heavier items such as stones. Losses can be low when the operation is done carefully but high with carelessness. With correct equipment, cleaning losses should be low in mills, but grain may be separated together with dirt or, alternatively, dirt may be carried forward into the milling stages. In drying, grain that is dried in yards or on roads, as is common in parts of Asia, may be partially consumed by birds and rodents. Wind, either natural or from passing vehicles in the case of road drying, can blow grain away.

The main cause of loss during drying is the cracking of grain kernels that are eaten whole, such as rice. Some grains may also be lost during the drying process. However, failure to dry crops adequately can lead to much higher levels of loss than poor-quality drying, and may result in the entire harvest becoming inedible. Adequate drying by farmers is essential if grains are to be stored on-farm and poorly dried grains for the market need to be sold quickly to enable the marketing-processing chain to carry out adequate drying before the grains become spoilt. With a high moisture content, grain is susceptible to mould, heating, discoloration and a variety of chemical changes. Ideally, most grains should be dried to acceptable levels within 2–3 days of harvest. One of the problems in assessing levels of post-harvest loss is in separating weight loss caused by the very necessary drying operations from weight loss caused by other, controllable, factors.

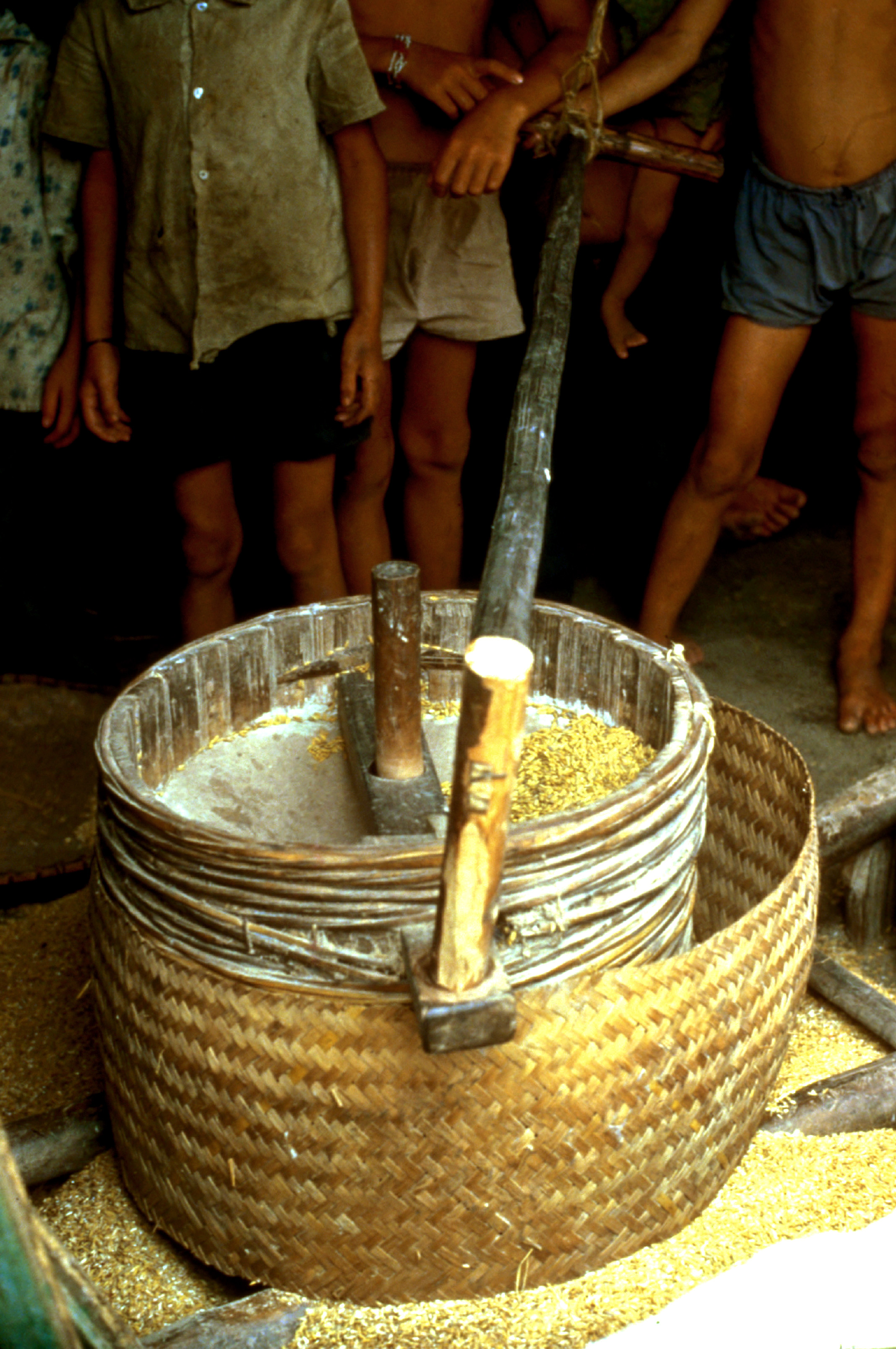
Manual rice mill in Vietnam

Milling to remove the outer coats from a grain may take place in one or more stages. For paddy rice considerable mechanical effort is needed to remove these layers. Any weakness in the kernel will be apparent at this stage. Even with grain in perfect condition, correctly set milling and polishing machinery is essential to yield high processing outturns. Complete separation of edible from less-desired products is always difficult to achieve but, even so, there are significant differences in milling efficiency. In the case of rice, milling outturns can vary from 60% or less to around 67%, depending on the efficiency of the mill. Even a 1% increase in yield of whole grain rice can thus result in huge increases in national food resources.

Grains are produced on a seasonal basis. In many places there is only one harvest a year. Thus most production of maize, wheat, rice, sorghum, millet, etc. must be held in storage for periods varying from a few days up to more than a year. Storage therefore plays a vital role in grain supply chains. For all grains, storage losses can be considerable but the greatest losses appear to be of maize, particularly in Africa. Losses in stored grain are determined by the interaction between the grain, the storage environment and a variety of organisms.

Contamination by moulds is mainly determined by the temperature of the grain and the availability of water and oxygen. Moulds can grow over a wide range of temperatures, but the rate of growth is lower with lower temperature and less water availability. The interaction between moisture and temperature is important. Maize, for example, can be stored for one year at a moisture level of 15% and a temperature of 15 °C (59 °F). However, the same maize stored at 30 °C (86 °F) will be substantially damaged by moulds within three months. Insects and mites (arthropods) can, of course, make a significant contribution towards the deterioration of grain, through the physical damage and nutrient losses caused by their activity.

They can also influence mould colonisation as carriers of mould spores and because their faecal material can be utilised as a food source by moulds. In general, grain is not infested by insects below 17 °C (63 °F) whereas mite infestations can occur between 3 and 30 °C (37 and 86 °F) and above 12% moisture content. The metabolic activity of insects and mites causes an increase in both the moisture content and temperature of infested grain. Another important factor that can affect mould growth is the proportion of broken kernels. There are about 1,700 species of rodents in the world, but only a few species contribute significantly to post-harvest losses. Three species are found throughout the world: the house mouse (Mus musculus), the black rat (Rattus rattus) and the brown rat while a few other species are important in Africa and Asia.

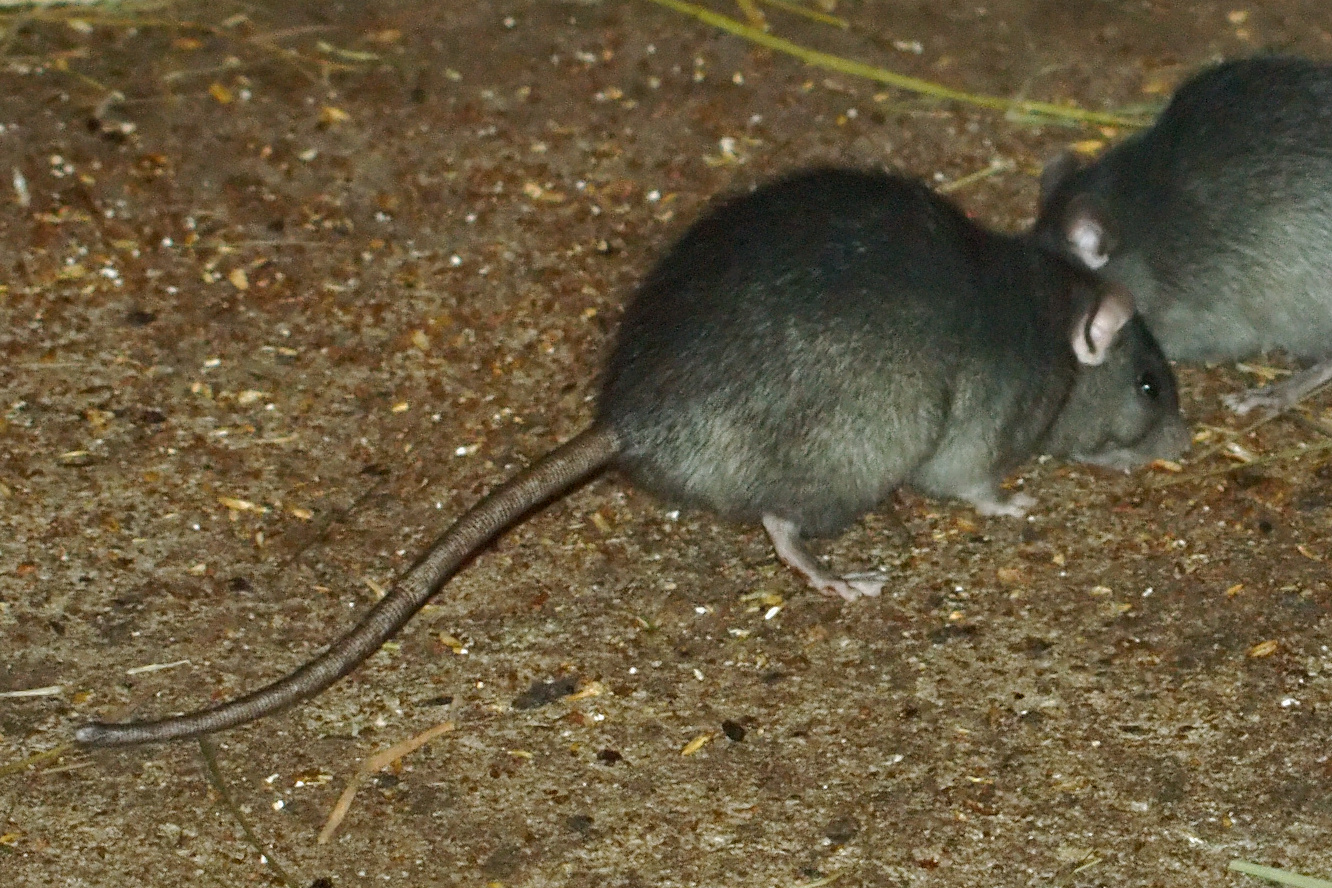
The Black Rat (Rattus rattus)

== Actual loss ==
The true extent of post-harvest losses is the subject of some dispute as they are difficult to measure accurately. The worst case is found in small production in developing countries, where, according to the World Food Programme, 40% is common. In Africa, post-harvest losses of maize from harvest to market sale are believed to amount to around 10-20%. Approximately 40% of these losses occur during storage at the farm and market, 30% during processing (drying, threshing, and winnowing), 20% in transport from the field to the homestead/farm, and the remaining 10% during transport to market.

== Loss assessment methods ==
An attempt should be made to approximate the magnitude of the value of losses before time is spent on trying to reduce them. If this value proves to be low, expenditure of appreciable resources on reducing losses may not be justified. However, despite efforts over the years to develop acceptable techniques for measuring grain losses, this remains an imperfect science. A particular problem with measurement is that grain does not follow a uniform sequence from producer to consumer. Harvested grain can be specially dried and treated for a family's consumption or for use as seed. Some of any harvest may be held for short-term storage, some more for long-term storage, and the rest may be sold either in one go or over a period of time, through a variety of different marketing channels. There are particular difficulties associated with accurately measuring on-farm storage losses over a long period when farmers are continually removing grain from stores to meet their own consumption needs. Further, the surplus generated by a farmer at any one harvest will dictate the quantity stored and the quantity sold, which, in turn, may influence loss levels. Given the lack of a consistent chain, care must be taken to avoid generalizing from particular measurements. "Inordinately high- and low-loss situations must be put into perspective rather than giving them overemphasis as has been the case in some instances."

The origin and justification of grain-loss estimates has thus never been particularly well- founded and attempts to measure losses suffer from the fact that it is an extremely complex and costly exercise to do well. To get round this problem the African Postharvest Losses Information System (APHLIS), was established in 2009. APHLIS generates weight loss data using an algorithm that refers to a postharvest loss profile (PLP) that is specific to the cereal crop, climate and scale of farming (smallholder or large scale) in question. The PLP is a set of loss figures, one for each link in the postharvest chain. Each PLP figure is the average of all those data available in the scientific literature for a particular crop (which include both quantitative weight loss figures and ‘informed guesstimates’), under a particular climate, and at a particular scale of agriculture. Given data on production and certain other relevant seasonal data, APHLIS can provide weight loss estimates for the provinces of many countries in Sub-Saharan Africa. The data are provided in tables and as interactive maps. A further important feature of APHLIS is that it provides a version of its loss calculator that can be downloaded from the website as an Excel file. Users can change default values in the spreadsheet and make calculations of losses at any desired geographical scale below the level of ‘province’. With this calculator, users can go beyond estimation of losses at one link in the postharvest chain, e.g. just storage losses, which was the typical approach of the 1970s, and instead by substituting what figures they have for the default values in the PLP they can generate an estimate of cumulative losses from production, in other words they can see the changes in cereal grain supply that result from improving or deteriorating losses across the postharvest value chain. APHLIS thus provides data that are transparent in the way they are calculated, adjustable year by year according to circumstances, and upgradeable as more (reliable) data become available.

== Attempts at loss reduction ==
There have been numerous attempts by donors, governments and technical assistance agencies over the years to reduce post-harvest losses in developing countries. Despite these efforts, losses are generally considered to remain high although, as noted, there are significant measurement difficulties. One problem is that while engineers have been successful in developing innovations in drying and storage these innovations are often not adopted by small farmers. This may be because farmers are not convinced of the benefits of using the technology. The costs may outweigh the perceived benefits and even if the benefits are significant the investment required from farmers may present them with a risk they are not prepared to take. Alternatively, the marketing chains may not reward farmers for introducing improvements. While good on-farm drying will lead to higher milling yields or reduced mycotoxin levels this means nothing to farmers unless they receive a premium for selling dry grains to traders and mills. This is often not the case.

Thus part of the problem with uptake may have been an overemphasis on technology, to the exclusion of socio-economic considerations. By investing in adequate sorting machines that sort grains by removing mould infested grains the grain industry can reduce losses. In the case of drying, it may be a more appropriate solution to strengthen the capacity of mills and traders to dry than attempt village-level improvements. There is thus a continual need to balance and blend technically ideal procedures and approaches with social, cultural, and political realities. Past on-farm storage interventions that have proved less than successful have included the promotion of costly driers in W. Africa that fell victim to termites when made with local wood or bamboo and were too expensive when constructed with sawn wood. In the 1980s, there was considerable enthusiasm for the introduction of ferro-cement and brick bins throughout Africa, but these were often found to be too complicated for farmers to construct, and too costly. Small Breeze block silos also experienced construction difficulties and were found to be not economically feasible. Storage cribs made of wood and chicken-wire were introduced by donors but rejected by farmers because sides made of chicken wire showed others the size of each farmer's harvest.

More positive achievements have been recorded in the Central African Republic, using a simple 1-tonne capacity structure that was found by farmers to be easy to construct and proved popular even without donor subsidies. Considerable success has been reportedly achieved with metal bins over the last 20 years in Central America and metal bins have been widely used for grain storage in Eswatini for half a century, drawing on the availability of local entrepreneurs who had been supplying metal water tanks. Replication of this success in other parts of Africa is very much in the pilot stage. Difficulties include the lack of local craftsmen to fabricate the bins; the need for grain stored in such bins to be dried to 14 °C (57 °F), and problems with carrying out the necessary fumigation. Small-scale bins for use inside the home appear to be having more success than larger bins for outside use. A relatively new development is hermetically sealed bags, which appear to offer good possibilities to store a variety of quantities, although further socio-economic evaluation is still required. The Purdue Improved Cowpea Storage (PICS) bags are hermetically sealed bags that allow small-scale farmers/users to store cowpea without any use of chemicals. Similarly, the International Rice Research Institute (IRRI) and US-based GrainPro Inc. have collaborated to develop hermetic storage bags referred as IRRI bags but widely known today as GrainPro SuperGrainbag that offers the lowest water vapor transmission rate and oxygen transmission rate of any hermetic bags available in the market.

== Sources ==
This article incorporates text from a free content work. Licensed under CC BY-SA 3.0 (license statement/permission). Text taken from The State of Food and Agriculture 2019. Moving forward on food loss and waste reduction, In brief, 24, FAO, FAO.
