= Clarke Energy =

Subsidiary of the Kohler Company

- Type: Limited company
- Industry: Combined heat and power, Data Centres, Biogas, Landfill gas, Biogas Upgrading, Sewage gas, Grid balancing, BESS, Hydrogen Carbon Recovery
- Founded: 1989
- Founder: Jim Clarke
- Headquarters: Knowsley, Liverpool, England, UK
- Area served: The United Kingdom, Ireland, France, Australia, New Zealand, India, Nigeria, Tunisia, Algeria, Bangladesh, Tanzania, South Africa, Botswana, Mozambique, Swaziland, Lesotho, Cameroon, Ghana, Ivory Coast, Kenya, Democratic Republic of the Congo, Rwanda, the United States, Greece, Romania
- Products: INNIO's Jenbacher gas engines, Power, cogeneration and trigeneration plants
- Services: Gas engine maintenance, engineering, project management
- Number of employees: ~1,500 (2026)
- Website: www.clarke-energy.com

Clarke Energy, a Rehlko company, is a multinational specialist in the sale, engineering, installation and maintenance of power plants that use gas engines. Clarke Energy is an independent company with its global head offices located in Knowsley, Liverpool and is an authorised distributor and service partner for INNIO's Jenbacher and Waukesha gas engines. Clarke Energy has over 1,500 staff in twenty seven countries worldwide including UK, Ireland, US, Australia, New Zealand, France, Greece, Romania, Tunisia, Nigeria, South Africa, Tanzania, India and Bangladesh. The company maintains a portfolio of applications for both low-carbon power and renewable energy generation.

== Applications and projects ==
Gas engines can be used in various gas-to-power applications including natural gas combined heat and power (CHP) / cogeneration, biogas, landfill gas, coal mine methane, synthetic gas, wood gas and associated petroleum gas. In the UK Clarke Energy is a leading supplier of landfill gas generation equipment, in Australia for Coal Mine gas engines and in France for natural gas cogeneration units. The company has worked on pioneering projects including the supply of the first GE biogas engines into sub-Saharan Africa near Lake Naivasha in Kenya and pioneering the use of CNG as a fuel with Nestle Nigeria.

== History ==
The company's current operations were established by Jim Clarke in 1989 and initially was a service provided for diesel engines. In 1995 Clarke Energy became distributor for Jenbacher Gas Engines. In 1998, from its original base in the UK Clarke Energy began to expand overseas. In 2002 GE acquired Jenbacher, the Austrian gas engine specialist company commencing Clarke Energy's status as an 'Authorized Distributor and Service provider' for GE. Clarke Energy helped develop some of the first projects as part of GE's Ecomagination initiative including a biogas projects in Punjab, India, and coal gas plants in Australia. Clarke Energy was acquired by US-based Kohler Co. in 2017.

=== Key events ===
- 1989 - Clarke Energy Established as an engine service company
- 1995 - Clarke Energy nominated as distributor for Jenbacher AG gas engine products in UK
- 1998 - Awarded distribution rights for Jenbacher in Australia, New Zealand and Nigeria
- 2003 - GE acquires Jenbacher AG. Clarke Energy acquires Cogen India, awarded distribution rights for Jenbacher in India
- 2004 - Clarke Energy acquires Jenbacher France, awarded distribution rights for France.
- 2005 - Clarke Energy awarded distribution rights for Jenbacher in Ireland. Previous distributor's contract cancelled.
- 2008 - Clarke Energy awarded distribution rights for Jenbacher in Tunisia
- 2011 - Clarke Energy awarded distribution rights for Jenbacher in Algeria
- 2012 - Clarke Energy awarded distribution rights for Jenbacher in Tanzania
- 2013 - Clarke Energy acquires Orient Energy Systems Bangladesh, Agaricus Trading and GE's South African Jenbacher gas engine service business. Awarded distribution rights for Bangladesh, South Africa, Botswana and Mozambique
- 2017 - Clarke Energy is acquired by Kohler Co.
- 2014 – Awarded distribution rights for Cameroon, USA, PNG, Morocco, Kenya, DRC, Rwanda, Ghana and Ivory Coast
- 2018 – Awarded distribution rights for Romania and Greece
- 2024 — Kohler Energy becomes standalone business, rebranded as Rehlko
- 2025 — Kyle Quinn appointed President, succeeding Jamie Clarke

== Affiliations and achievements ==
Clarke Energy is a member of the Combined Heat and Power Association, the Renewable Energy Association and a founding member of Lord Redesdale's Anaerobic Digestion and Biogas Association Clarke Energy is also a multiple award winner of the British Safety Council's International Safety Award. Clarke Energy was named 'Business of the Year 2012' in the Knowsley Business Awards. In 2012 ECI Partners acquired a minority stake in Clarke Energy. In 2013 the company was awarded 'Export Champion' status by UK Trade and Investment. In 2014 the company was announced as a winner of the Queen's Award for Enterprise (International Trade) for having achieved 6 years' sustained growth. The company also won the 2014 British Renewable Energy Award for Innovation, and 'Business of the Year >250 employees' in the (Liverpool City Region) Regional Business Awards.

The company was also a finalist in the British Renewable Energy Awards 2013 & 2014 and the Energy Awards 2013 It was awarded The Queen's Award for Enterprise: International Trade (Export) (2014).
