= ADBA =

ADBA may refer to:

- Anaerobic Digestion and Biogas Association
- American Dog Breeders Association
- Australian Defence Basketball Association
- 'Allelujah! Don't Bend! Ascend!, an album by Godspeed You! Black Emperor, released in 2012
