= UBC Biomass Research and Demonstration Facility =

Coordinates: 49°15′37″N 120°15′15″W

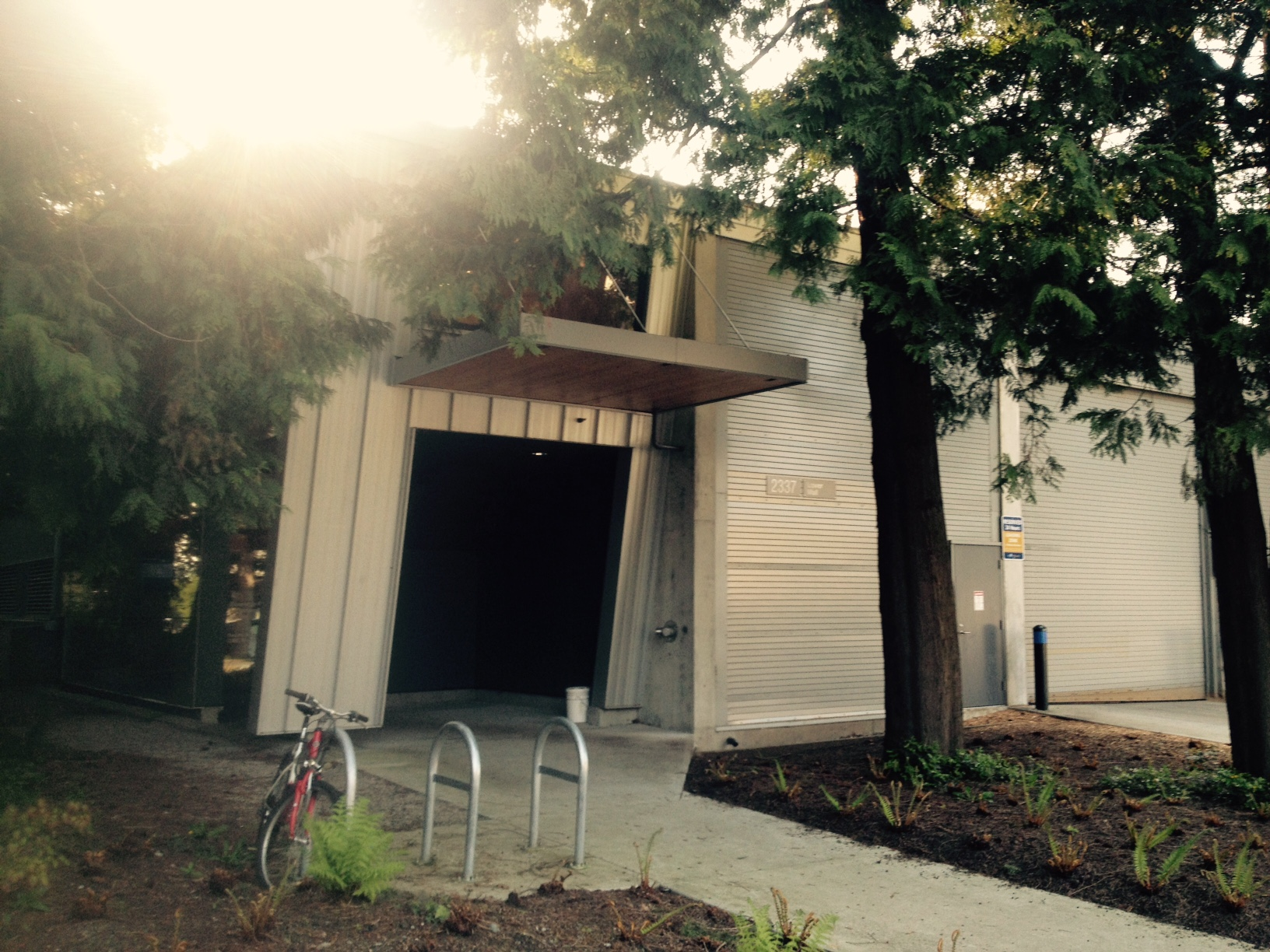
- Entrance to the UBC Biomass Research and Demonstration Facility
- Industry: Renewable energy
- Location: Vancouver, British Columbia
- Country: Canada
- Key people: John Gorjup, OERD, NRCan

Cost
- Cost: $ 28 million
- CEF contribution: $ 10.8 million
- Homepage: UBC-bioenergy-research-and-demonstration-facilitycom

The Biomass Research and Demonstration Facility uses biomass to create clean heat and energy. This facility is located at 2329 West Mall in Vancouver at the University of British Columbia's West Point Grey Campus. Official operation began in September 2012, by combining syngas and gasification conditioning systems with a Jenbacher engine. The highest potential output of this system is 2 MWe (megawatts) of electricity and 9600 lbs of steam per hour. This system is the first of its type in all of Canada, and it was put together by the cooperation of three parties: General Electric (GE), Nexterra, and the University of British Columbia (UBC).

== History ==
In 2007, the IPCC (Intergovernmental Panel on Climate Change) came up with the conclusion that human-made emissions are destabilizing the earth's natural systems. As a response to this problem, the Greenhouse Gas Reduction Targets Act (GHGRTA) was set to the public bodies of British Columbia, including UBC. The GHGRTA had expectations that UBC would become carbon-neutral (Bill 44, compensating for the excess carbon emissions by cash through carbon credits system) by 2010.

By March 24, 2010, then-UBC President Stephen Toope announced UBC's dedication to climate action summed up by three future carbon reduction targets; 33% below 2007 levels by 2015, 66% below by 2020, and 100% below by 2050. To achieve the 2015 goal, UBC Climate Action Plan committed 117 million dollars to three goals: converting steam heating systems to hot water systems, reducing emissions by 22%, optimizing academic building and behavior change programs, and the UBC biomass research and demonstration facility, which will reduce emissions by 9% for a total of 33% of reduced emissions by UBC from 2007 levels.

== Contributors ==
Represented as an initiative by Climate Action Plan UBC, this project began operation in May 2011 and is composed of three parties: UBC, GE Energy and Nexterra. The Biomass Research and Demonstration Facility takes advantage of gasification processes resulting in a clean source of renewable heat and power. The major owners of this project are Tandem Expansion Fund and the Business Development Bank of Canada (BCD).

The project includes efforts from UBC, Nexterra and GE Energy. The process began in 2010 to create North America's first demonstration of a community-scale version of an internal combustion engine that was based on a combined heat and power (CHP) system fuelled by woody biomass.

Nexterra was founded in Vancouver, Canada, and creates energy-from-waste gasification systems for the production of clean, renewable heat and power. It utilizes biomass in the form of wood chips which it treats to create fuel for its bioenergy systems. Its other projects include:

- Birmingham Bio Power Ltd., a 10 MWe power plant in Tyseley, UK
- US Department of Veterans Affairs (VA) Medical Center in Battle Creek, Michigan
- University of Northern British Columbia

General Electric (GE) and its division GE Energy help with the project by providing the Jenbacher engine. GE is a large American conglomerate that has many different branches. It is constantly ranked as a Fortune 500 company.

== Technology ==
The system is designed by Nexterra, and combines Nexterra's gasification and syngas conditioning technologies with GE's Jenbacher engines. This is an energy-from-renewable-waste combined heat and power (CHP) system. This system will produce 2MW of electricity from the engine and 3MW of thermal energy to heat the campus. The system has two main modes of operation:

- Demonstration mode: the syngas is then conditioned to remove any impurities and used in the Jenbacher engine to drive a generator that creates electricity.
- Thermal mode: which uses nexterras gasification technology to turn biomass into a clean synthesis gas or syngas. The syngas then replaces natural gas to create steam and hot water to meet the campus' needs.

=== Process ===
At the beginning of this procedure, biological materials (in UBC's case, wood chips) are gathered and put through two sets of procedures involving the combined Heat and Power Mode and the Thermal Mode Systems.

==== Heat and Power Mode System (demonstration mode) ====
1. Moisture content in wood chips is reduced to 20% by the biomass dryer.
2. Treated wood chips are conveyed by a horizontal auger which feeds fuel to the vertical auger that then pushes the fuel up into the fuel pile inside the gasifier.
3. The gasifier converts wood chips to clean, renewable synthetic gas (syngas). There are three main steps in this process.
  1. Gasifier: Takes the fuel and then puts it through drying, pyrolysis, gasification and reduction to ash. Inside heat and restricted oxygen allows the fuel to undergo gasification.
  2. Automatic ash removal system: The non-combustatble ash is pushed towards the bottom of the gasifier where it is periodically removed through hydraulically controlled grates. After being removed by the grates the ash is moved away by two parallel augers.
  3. Syngas: Exits the gasifier at 500–700 °F (260–371 °C). Then the syngas can be combusted in a close-coupled oxidizer. The resulting heat can be used to create energy in many different ways. e.g. boilers, heat exchanges, or it can be cleaned and used for the firing of internal combustion engines. It could also be to create higher value gases or chemicals.
- This process creates 2MWe towards the UBC electric grid and 9600 lbs of steam per hour, which equates to 12% of total campus heat consumption. The gas engine currently runs on renewable natural gas to boost overall energy production rather than the syngas.

==== Thermal Mode System ====
1. Syngas is taken to the oxidizer and burned after the gasifier.
2. Gas from oxidizer is then used to in the boiler to produce steam.
3. The steam is then used in UBC's existing heating infrastructure.
4. The gas from this process is cleaned in an electrostatic precipitator (ESP) before it is released. The ESP removes almost all of the particulate matter.
- The Thermal Mode System creates 20,000 lbs of steam per hour, which fulfills 25% of heat consumption at UBC.

== Project outcomes ==
=== University of British Columbia ===
- Project lead: John Gorjup, OERD, NRCan – Ottawa
- Lead proponent: University of British Columbia
- CEF contribution: $10.8 million
- Project total: $28 million
- Strategic area: bioenergy
- Location: UBC Point Grey Campus, Vancouver, British Columbia

Project status, since operation began in July 2012 until December 2014:

- Consumed 20,544 oven dry metric tonnes of biomass
- Operated in Thermal Mode for 17,174 hours
- Produced conditioned syngas for 406 hours
- Experienced engine and generator runtime of 3,835 hours
- Produced: 245,034 GJ of steam, 1,077 MWh of hot water, 6216 MWh of electricity
