= Anaerobic Digestion and Biogas Association =

Anaerobic Digestion and Bioresources Association
- Abbreviation: ADBA
- Formation: 2009
- Purpose: The voice of Anaerobic Digestion and Bioresources in the UK
- Location(s): The Anaerobic Digestion and Bioresources Association, Sustainable Bankside, 105 Sumner Street, London SE1 9HZ
- Region served: UK
- Chief Executive: Charlotte Morton
- Website: ADBA Homepage

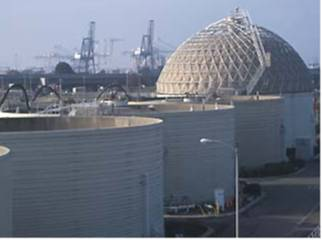
Anaerobic digesters: Through anaerobic digestion, bacteria can digest the food waste to produce methane, a valuable energy source when captured.

The Anaerobic Digestion and Bioresources Association (ADBA), formerly the Anaerobic Digestion and Biogas Association, is a United Kingdom-based trade association that operates to represent business involved in the anaerobic digestion and biogas sectors.

ADBA was founded in September 2009 by Lord Redesdale and 10 founder member companies with the aim of representing the interests of businesses in the industry. ADBA seeks to promote the development of the anaerobic digestion industry throughout the UK, with the intent that this should be achieved within a decade from its inception. Their primary purpose is to eliminate the barriers that organisations face in this area.

Recognising there was no industry group that exclusively represented the emerging anaerobic digestion industry in the UK (previously the Renewable Energy Association and the Association for Organics Recycling had break out groups related to anaerobic digestion) ADBA was formed by a number of UK-based companies which specialise in anaerobic digestion technologies including, Clarke Energy, Entec, Kirk Environmental and Monsal.

During its relatively short time in existence, ADBA has made a number of significant contributions to the development of legislation including promoting higher levels of feed-in tariffs for digestion plants and a biomethane carbon credit trading platform. It now represents over 370 member companies.

On 1 October 2014, the ADBA announced that it was changing its name with immediate effect to the Anaerobic Digestion & Bioresources Association, "in response to a rapidly changing political and economic landscape."
