= Jenbacher =

Austrian engine manufacturer

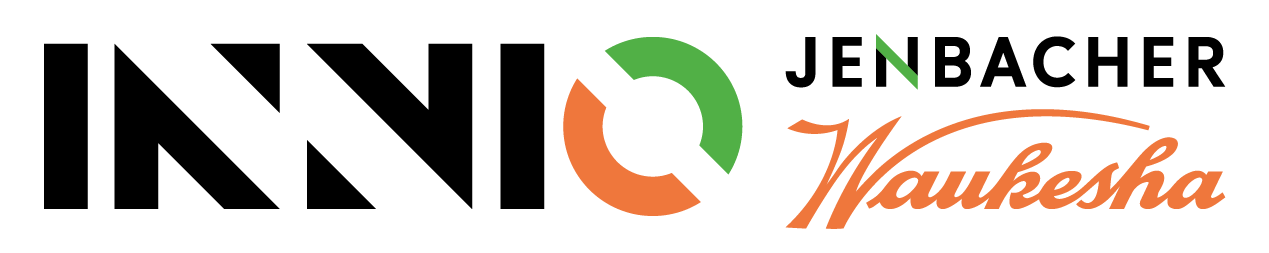
- Company type: GmbH & Co. OHG
- Industry: Cogeneration, peaking power plants, biogas energy, mine gas management
- Predecessor: Jenbacher Werke AG
- Founded: 1959
- Headquarters: Jenbach, Austria
- Products: Reciprocating engines, generator sets
- Website: www.innio.com

INNIO Jenbacher designs and manufactures gas engines and cogeneration modules in the Austrian town of Jenbach in Tyrol. It is part of the INNIO portfolio of products and is one of their gas engine technologies; the other being Waukesha Engines. Jenbacher emerged from the former Jenbacher Werke, which was founded in 1959 and manufactured gas and diesel engines, and locomotives. The company was bought out by General Electric in 2003. In November 2018 the company became part of INNIO as part of an acquisition of Advent International and was renamed INNIO Jenbacher GmbH & Co. OHG.

== History ==
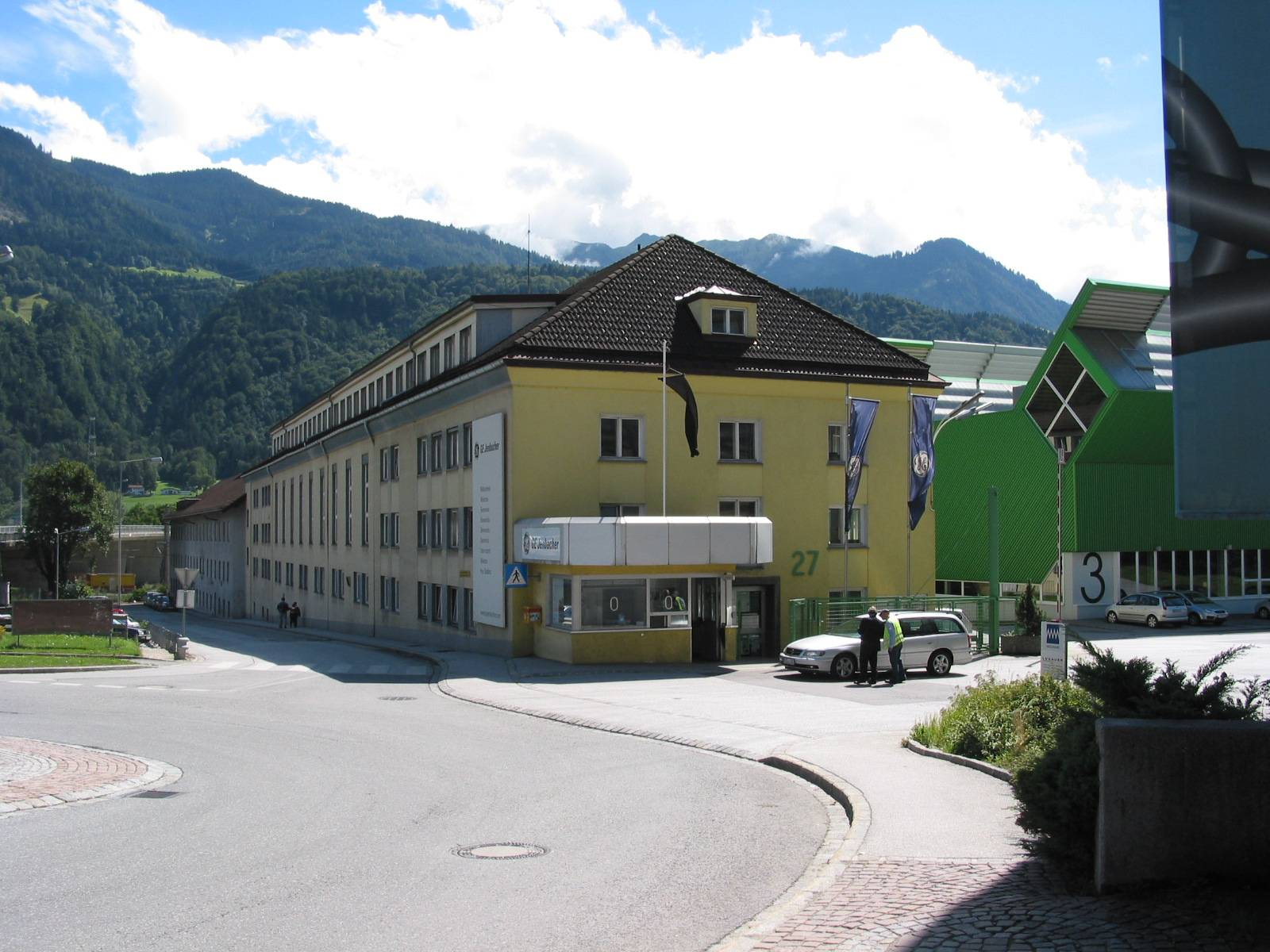
Company building in Jenbach

Although the company itself has a relatively short history, its origins go far back. In 1487, a mine and foundry was founded by the Fugger family. In 1657, all Fugger properties in Tyrol were taken over by the state. Due to exhaustion of the copper and silver deposits, the mine changed its focus to iron. The company was acquired by Julius and Theodor Reitlinger in 1881. In 1909, the mine ran out of iron as well, and after a boom during the First World War only the foundry was left. In 1914, Friedrich Reitlinger took over the factory after the death of Julius Reitlinger, making it a state-protected company at the start of the First World War. In 1938, shortly after Austria's annexation to the National Socialist German Reich, he committed suicide with his daughter after being held captive in his home by the National Socialists. The company was confiscated and Aryanized for the benefit of the state of Tyrol. At the beginning of World War II, all of Tyrol was seized and Aryanized, and the company was to 'work for the benefit of the country'. The plant made brake pads for the Deutsche Reichsbahn, and from 1939 they made airframe parts and rocket motors in Jenbach (some to liquid-fueled aircraft rocket engine designs from Hellmuth Walter KG) for Heinkel as the licensee. The plant thus became the largest armaments factory in Tyrol. There was massive use of Nazi forced labor: two thirds of the 3,000 employees were forced laborers. [2] A women's camp, which was a subcamp of the Reichenau labor education camp under the control of the Gestapo, was located at the Jenbacher Heinkel-Werke. The Ukrainian forced laborer Eugenia Kaser reports deplorable conditions in the camp. In 1945 it was occupied by the American army. After the collapse at the end of the Second World War the factory was placed under public administration. It had to be converted to civilian production, and started out with cookware, but also started with the repair of railway wagons.

Because of the availability of appropriate specialists and skilled workers, it was decided to concentrate on the production of diesel engines. The first product was a 15 hp two-stroke engine, which was very successful and was manufactured in large quantities. This was followed by more two-stroke and four stroke models of engine. The JW 15, 8 TO 15 Hp; the JW20, 15 to 20 Hp; and the JW20M, the same engine, but with inertial mass damping to counteract the vibrations of the single cylinder. The company was now pushed to develop generators, compressors and pumps of the same quality.

In 1959 the company was constituted as Jenbacher Werke AG, the main shareholders being Creditanstalt with 35% and Mannesmann with 26%, the rest being free float. Creditanstalt increased its share steadily and after the purchase of Mannesmann's share through the CA-controlled Andritz AG they acquired a vast majority of the share capital. In 1979, 1,550 people were employed at the plant. In 1988 the majority of the company was acquired by Auricon Beteiligungs AG. In 1991 it was organized into the Jenbacher Energy Systems AG (JES) and the Jenbacher Transport Systems Ltd. (JTS) divisions. In the same year, JTS acquired 29.9% of the British company Telfos Holding, which gave the company an influence on Ganz-Hunslet, the former Hungarian locomotive works Ganz-MÁVAG. On December 12, 1991, JTS attained majority share capital of Telfos, and bought out General Electric's remaining share in 1993. In 1997, Jenbacher attempted to enter the tram market with help from AEG through a Jenbacher daughter company called Integral Verkehrstechnik AG Jenbach. Integral lost over 22 million Euros from 1997 to 2001, and led to the sale of the Jenbacher rail car division to Connex. In 1998 Jenbacher started its relationship with Clarke Energy which is now one of its largest gas engine distributors, The remaining gas engine-energy division was acquired by General Electric in 2003. In 2018 GE sold its Jenbacher and Waukesha brands to the private equity company Advent International which created the new company INNIO.

In 2020, Innio takes over the spare parts manufacturer and gas engine service specialist PowerUP, which was founded in 2016 by former Innio employees.

== Rail cars ==
Jenbacher's railway activities started in 1945, when they started performing repairs of rolling stock for the French occupation forces. In 1949, they started making diesel engines, power cars, trucks and compressors powered by the aforementioned engines. In addition, they made rail cars for the Austrian Federal Railways and other railroad companies.

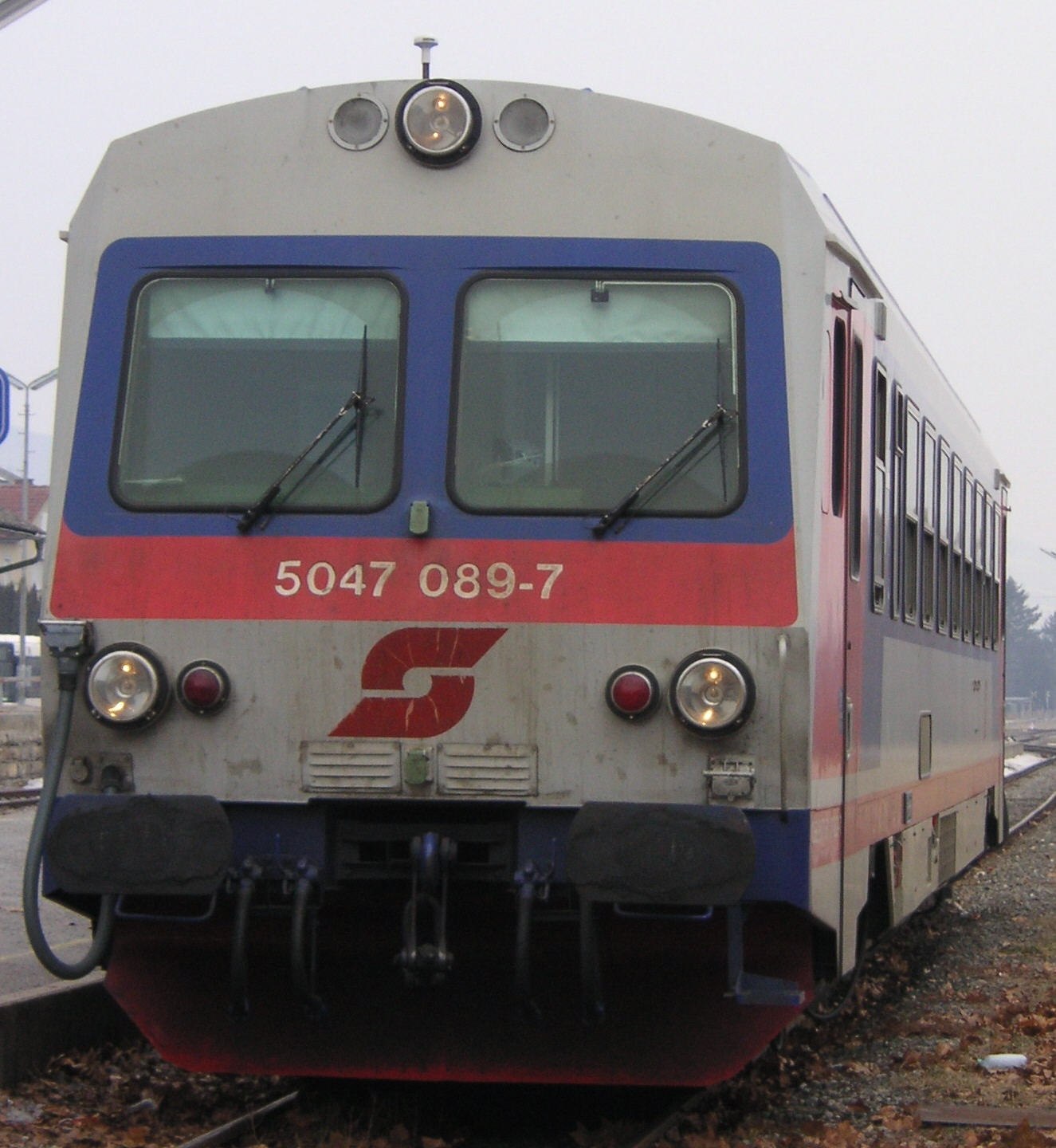
ÖBB Class 5047

Jenbacher Werke designated their locomotives according to a system derived from the type of power transmission, approximate performance, wheel arrangement or application and the operating weight. The ÖBB series 2060 was therefore the work designation DH200B28. The other models carried the name JW. The Railway engineering department was taken over by Molinari Rail.

== Company profile and products ==
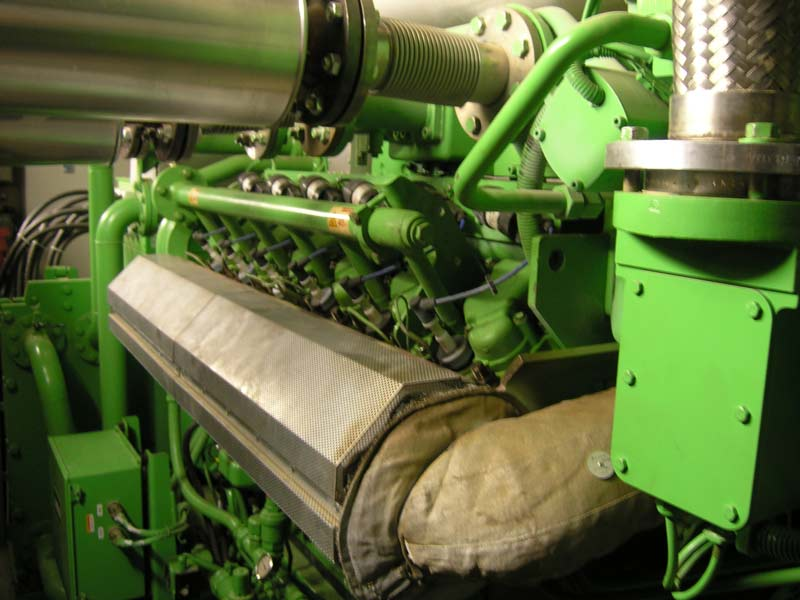
A Jenbacher gas engine running on biogas (bio-methane) in Güssing, Austria

Jenbacher currently specializes in lean burn gas engines, including cogeneration plants and containerized power generator sets utilizing said gas engines. Jenbacher began producing gas engines in 1957.

Jenbacher's main facility still resides in Jenbach in Austria, and employs over 1400 workers. Jenbacher manufactures the gas engines from the ground-up at this facility, including in-house crankshafts.

Jenbacher gas engines are exclusively Otto cycle units with industrial grade spark plugs providing ignition. Smaller models utilize stoichiometric combustion, while the larger engines are lean burn engines with prechamber ignition.

Jenbacher engines run on natural gas, landfill gas, sewage gas, biogas, mine gas, coal gas, syngas and hydrogen. Due to this flexibility they are often used in applications where gas would normally be flared off or released into the atmosphere, to turn waste into energy. Methane has a much higher global warming potential than CO_{2}, and it is therefore interesting for operators to burn gas in engines instead of releasing it into the atmosphere. Further applications include data centers, greenhouses or heat & power units for industrial use. They are also offered as containerised units.

=== Jenbacher J920 FleXtra ===
The Jenbacher J920 FleXtra is Jenbacher's newest product, a V20 gas engine delivering up to 9.5 MW (12,915 PS). When it is put into production it will be Jenbachers most efficient gas engine available with an electrical efficiency of 48.7%, and a combined heat and power thermal efficiency of over 90%.

The J920 uses Miller cycle valve timing and two-stage turbocharging, along with a 'three-module' construction consisting of the engine itself, the electrical generator and the turbocharging unit consisting of both turbochargers and charge air coolers along with intake and exhaust piping and bypass valves. In common with most current marine diesel engines, the J920 has a segmented camshaft, along with combining individual cylinder heads, the cylinder liner, piston and connecting rod into one easily removable modular 'power unit' for ease of maintenance and overhaul.

== See also ==
- Clarke Energy
