= Waukesha Engine =

Brand of industrial engines

Waukesha Type A,H,I,J,K,L,M (1913)

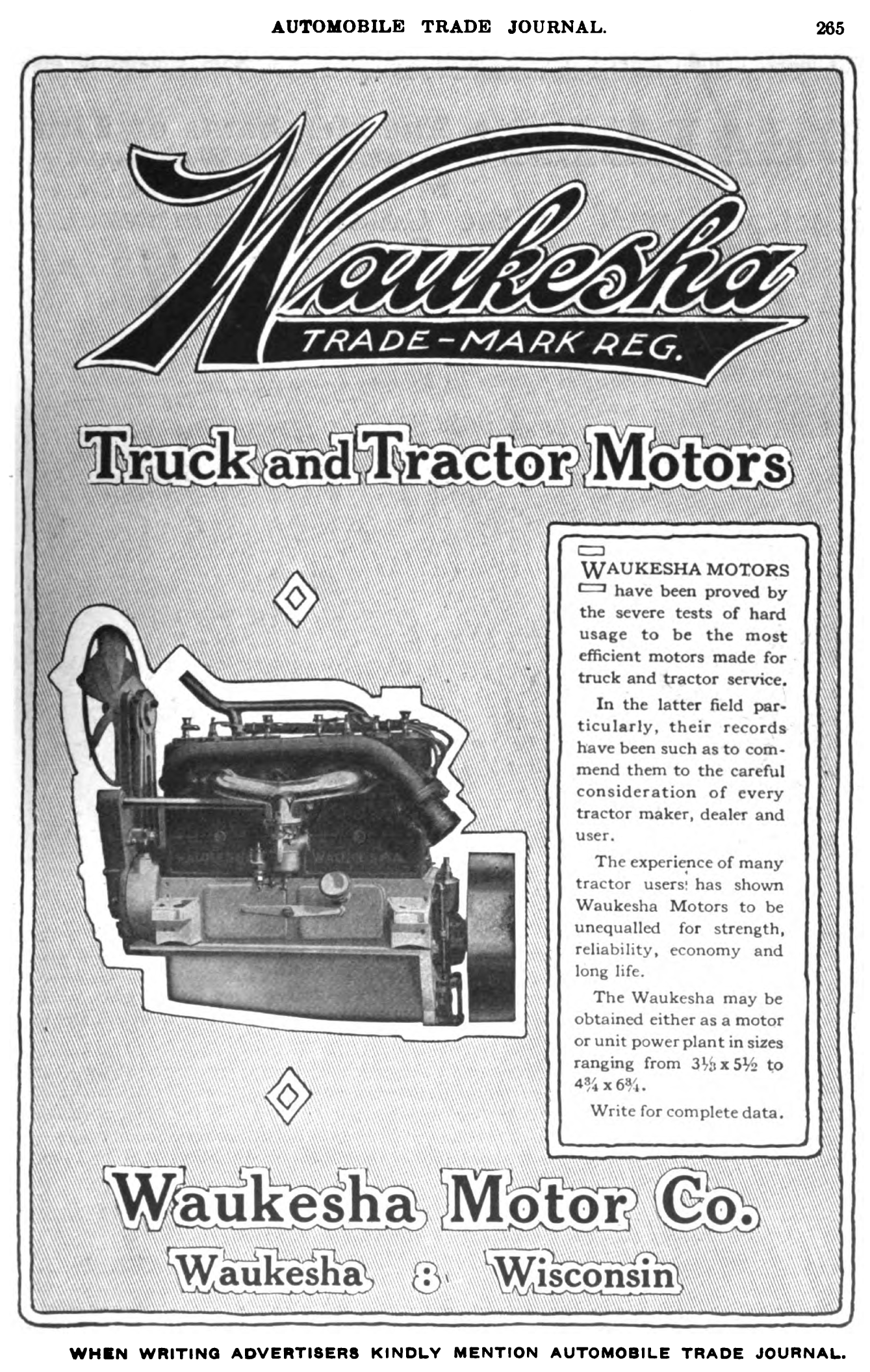
Waukesha Motor Company advertisement in the Automobile Trade Journal, 1916.

Waukesha is a brand of large stationary reciprocating engines produced by INNIO Waukesha Gas Engines, a business unit of the INNIO Group. It builds large gas engines and related industrial equipment for natural gas compression and for power generation.

For 62 years, Waukesha was an independent supplier of gasoline engines, diesel engines, multifuel engines (gasoline/kerosene/ethanol), and LNG/propane engines to many truck, tractor, heavy equipment, automobile, boat, ship, and engine-generator manufacturers. In 1906, the Waukesha Motor Company was founded in Waukesha, Wisconsin.

In 1957, Waukesha bought the Climax Engineering Co. of Clinton, Iowa, also a noted builder of large engines.

In 1968, Waukesha Motor Company was acquired by the Bangor-Punta Corporation.

In 1973, Waukesha sold the Climax division to the Arrow Engine Company.

In 1974, Waukesha Motor Company was sold to Dresser Industries and became Dresser's Waukesha Engine Division; its typical nicknames afterward were Waukesha Engine and Dresser Waukesha.

In 1989, Dresser acquired the Brons company of the Netherlands.

In 2010, Dresser, including Dresser Waukesha, was acquired by GE Energy.

On January 20, 2014, Barack Obama visited the plant where he gave a speech on increasing the minimum wage to $10.10 an hour. He also discussed wage equality for women. Afterwards he took a tour of the plant.

On September 28, 2015, GE announced it was closing the plant for good and moving the engine manufacturing operations to Canada.

In November 2018 INNIO announced that Advent International has completed the acquisition of GE’s Distributed Power business, being a stand-alone energy company rebranded as INNIO. The transaction included the Jenbacher and Waukesha product lines, the digital platform and related services offerings, with main operating sites in Austria, Canada and the United States.

Since July 2019 the Waukesha and Jenbacher business units service their segments and customers around the world as independent entities under the INNIO umbrella brand.
