= Australian Defence Force Basketball Association =

The Australian Defence Force Basketball Association (ADFBA) formed in 1983, is an accredited Australian Defence Force sporting association under the auspices of the Australian Defence Force Sports Council (ADFSC).

Australian Defence Force Basketball Association
Country	Australia
Founded	1983
Patron	Brigadier Paul Nothard, CSC
Honours
Silver Medals (4)
Women(3)	2009, 1999, 1997
Men(1)	1999
Bronze Medals (4)
Women(2)	2007, 1995
Men(2)	2005, 1997

== ADF Combined Service National Championships ==
Year	Location	Champion Women	Champion Men
2024	RAAF Base Williams, Laverton VIC	NSW	NSW
2023	RAAF Base Williams, Laverton VIC	QLD	QLD
2022	RAAF Base Townsville, Garbutt QLD	QLD	NSW
2021	Not held	Not held	Not held
2020	Not held	Not held	Not held
2019	RAAF Base Williams, Laverton VIC	QLD	NSW
2018	RAAF Base Edinburgh SA	NSW/VIC	NSW
2017	RAAF Base Edinburgh SA	VIC	NSW
2016	RAAF Base Edinburgh SA	NSW	NSW
2015	RAAF Base Williams, Laverton VIC	NSW	QLD
2014	RAAF Base Edinburgh SA	QLD	QLD
2013	Randwick Barracks, Randwick NSW	ACT/Wagga	QLD
2012	RAAF Base Williams, Laverton VIC	QLD	QLD
2011	RAAF Base Williamtown NSW	QLD	QLD
2010	Not held	Not held	Not held
2009	Latchford Barracks, Bonegilla VIC	ACT	NSW
2008	RAAF Base Williams, Laverton VIC	VIC	NSW
2007	RAAF Base Wagga, Forest Hill NSW	ACT	NT
2006	RAAF Base Townsville, Garbutt QLD	ACT	NSW
2005	RAAF Base Williamtown NSW	NSW	NSW
2004	RAAF Base Williams, Laverton VIC	NSW	NSW
2003	Randwick Barracks, Randwick NSW	NSW	NSW
2002	RAAF Base Wagga, Forest Hill NSW	NT	NSW
2001	Leeuwin Barracks, Fremantle WA	VIC	QLD
2000	Borneo Barracks, Cabarlah QLD	VIC	QLD
1999	Randwick Barracks, Randwick NSW	NT	NSW
1998	Randwick Barracks, Randwick NSW	QLD	QLD
1997	Randwick Barracks, Randwick NSW	QLD	QLD
1996	Borneo Barracks, Cabarlah QLD	QLD	ACT
1995	RAAF Base Williamtown NSW	VIC	ACT
1994	Borneo Barracks, Cabarlah QLD	QLD	SA
1993	RAAF Base Williams, Point Cook VIC	QLD	SA
1992	RAAF Base Edinburgh SA	QLD	QLD
1991	Randwick Barracks, Randwick NSW	VIC	ACT
1990	HMAS Albatross, Nowra NSW	QLD	VIC
1989	HMAS Cerberus, Crib Point VIC	VIC	VIC
1988	RAAF Base Williams, Laverton VIC	VIC	NSW
1987	Tobruk Barracks, Puckapunyal VIC	NSW	VIC
1986	Randwick Barracks, Randwick NSW	QLD	NSW
1985	Randwick Barracks, Randwick NSW	VIC	VIC
1984	RAAF Base Edinburgh SA	NSW	NSW
1983	HMAS Cerberus, Crib Point VIC	NSW	NSW

== ADFBA National Teams ==
Year	Tours	Women's Coach	Men's Coach
2025	Samoa	Ruth Wicks	Jo Mercieca
2023	All Star Teams	Daniel Swift	Dean Burke
2022	All Star Teams	Janeter Turnbull	Dean Burke
2020	Not held	Bettina Stelzer	Dean Burke
2019	Arafura Games	Dean Burke	Bill Lawrie
2018	Victorian Regional Tour	Bettina Stelzer	Dean Burke
2017	Tasmanian Regional Tour	Janeter Turnbull	Dean Burke
2016	Tasmanian Regional Tour	Janeter Turnbull	Dean Burke
2015	Brisbane Regional Tour, QLD	Janeter Turnbull	Dean Burke
2014	Singapore (Cancelled)	Janeter Turnbull	Dean Burke
2013	No Tour Held	Janeter Turnbull	Bruce Ferguson
2012	Western Australia	Janeter Turnbull	Bruce Ferguson
2011	Arafura Games	Janeter Turnbull	Bruce Ferguson
2009	Arafura Games	Dean Burke	Mick Kearney
2008	New Zealand	Dean Burke	Mick Kearney
2007	Arafura Games	Dean Burke	Mick Kearney
2006	Singapore	Bill Lawrie	Mick Kearney
2005	Arafura Games	Bruce Ferguson	Mick Kearney
2004	New Zealand	Mick Kearney	Mick Kearney
2003	New Zealand, Australian Institute of Sport	John Tauschke	Bill Lawrie
2002		Cath Wilsen	Bill Lawrie
2001	Arafura Games	Bill Lawrie	Mark Thomas
2000		Scott Cranfield	Mick Kearney
1999	Arafura Games	Tony Cotton	Mick Kearney
1998	United Kingdom	Scott Cranfield	Mick Kearney
1997	Arafura Games	Scott Cranfield	Bill Lawrie
1996	Australian Institute of Sport	Scott Cranfield	Bill Lawrie
1995	Arafura Games	Craig Button	Bill Lawrie
1994	Australian Institute of Sport	Scott Cranfield	Bill Lawrie
1993		Scott Cranfield	Mick Kearney
1992		Bill Lawrie	Mick Kearney
1991	New Zealand	Bill Lawrie	Mick Kearney
1990		Tony Cotton	Mick Kearney
1989	New Zealand; Country VIC, NSW & QLD.	Tony Cotton	Mick Kearney
1988		Tony Cotton	Mick Kearney
1987		Laddy Koch	Mick Kearney
1986		Laddy Koch	Rod Cooper
1985		Laddy Koch	Rod Cooper
1984		Laddy Koch	Rod Cooper
1983	New Zealand	John Nordheim	Rod Cooper

== Awards ==
=== Most Valuable Players ===
The Bob Croxton Trophy is awarded to the women's MVP and the Brian Egan Trophy to the men's MVP.

Year	MVP Women	State	Service	MVP Men	State	Service
2024	Pani Davidson	NSW		Ethan Imber	QLD	Australia
2023	Tegan Ross	ACT		Adam Kerle	QLD	Australia
2022	Sophie Ackerly & Kylie Guarino	QLD & ACT	Australia	Liam Martin	WA	Australia
2019	Lee Piantadosi & Georgia Roberts	NSW & QLD	Australia	Billy Hancocks	NT	Australia
2018	Sam Bastick	NT	Australia	Dimitrios Papas	NSW	Australia
2017	Gracey Amey	QLD	Australia	Alex Brown	NSW	
2016	Annie Tanner	NSW	Australia	Rob Cameron	SA	Australia
2015	Grace Amey	QLD	Australia	Andrew Olechnowicz	QLD	Australia
2014	Grace Amey	QLD	Australia	Mitch Foster	NSW	Australia
2013	Wendy Jeffrey	VIC	Australia	Aaron Marsh "Gobba"	ADFBA Masters	Australia
2012	Erin Mrnjavac	QLD	Australia	James Rowden	SA	
2011	Kylie Guarino	SA	Australia	Ash Condon	NSW	
2009	Karen Hill	ACT		Tim Muehlberg & Andrew Boylen	SA & WA	
2008	Fiona Harris	NT		Richard Van Der Snoek	NSW	
2007	Karen Herbert "Buzz"	ACT		Mitch Selwood	NT	Australia
2006	Kylie Guarino "Guido"	VIC	Australia	Andy Peate	SA	
2005	Kylie Guarino "Guido"	VIC	Australia	Andrew Olechnowicz	VIC	Australia
2004	Heather Edwards (Marsh)	NSW		Ken Robertson "Busta"	ACT	
2003	Jayne Tauschke	WA	Australia	Dean Hill & Andy Peate	ACT & NSW	
2002	Wendy Keogh	NT	Australia	Dean Hill	ACT	
2001	Jayne Tauschke & Sarah Webb	VIC & NSW	Australia	Scott Northey	NSW	
2000	Jayne Monaghan (Tauschke)	VIC	Australia	Dean Hill	ACT	
1999	Jayne Monaghan (Tauschke)	NT	Australia	Steve Loeweke	NT	Australia
1998	Jayne Monaghan (Tauschke)	NSW	Australia	Scott Northey	VIC	
1997	Moria Betts	ACT		Dean Burke	SA	
1996	Jayne Monaghan (Tauschke)	NSW	Australia	John Tauschke	NT	
1995	Moria Betts	SA		John Brown	SA	United States Air Force
1994	Bettina Stelzer	QLD	Australia	John Tauschke	NT	
1993	Julie Zuppan	VIC	Australia	John Brown	SA	United States Air Force
1992	Donna Tucker	VIC		Gary Browning	VIC	
1991	Kerri Saunders (Kearney)	VIC	Australia	John Van Den Hurk	VIC	
1990	Cathy Gray (Wilsen)	QLD	Australia	Phil Antrobus	NSW	Australia
1989	Kerri Saunders (Kearney)	VIC	Australia	Kel Crowell	QLD	
1988	Jan Osbourne	VIC		John Tauschke	ACT	
1987	Cathy Gray (Wilsen)	VIC	Australia	Pete Wilkinson	ACT	
1986	Dianne Carter	NSW		Bruce Fallon	NSW	
1985	Teela Prince	QLD	Australia	Bruce Fallon	NSW	
1984	Diedre Anderson	VIC		Gary Browning	VIC	
1983	Gillian Parkes	NSW	Australia	Graham Joce "Jock"	SA	

=== Player's Player Award ===
Award voted on by the players in recognition of an admired competitor. Female's Player's Player is awarded the Donna Puglisi Trophy. Male's Player's Player is awarded the Chris Siegmann Trophy.

Year	Women	State	Service	Men	State	Service
2024	Grace Amey	QLD	Australia	Jakeb Morrison	ACT	
2023	Madeline Moroney	NT		Oliver Lipshus	VIC	Australia
2022	Kandis Ivas-Duncan	ACT		Karl Turvey	QLD	Australia
2019	Lara Pilton	NSW		Michael Zitha	VIC	
2018	Kadi Sonntag	NSW	Australia	Rob Jensen	VIC	Australia
2017	Charlotte Taylor	SA	Australia	Rob Cameron	ACT	Australia
2016	Ruth Wicks	QLD	Australia	Nick Munday & Thomas Zerna	VIC & VIC	Australia Australia
2015	Jeska Matthews	QLD	Australia	Jay Dalton	NSW	Australia
2014	Heather Marsh Grace Amey	NSW QLD	Australia	Mitch Mundie Richard Ven Der Snoek	NT VIC	Australia
2013	Kylie Guarino "Guido" Karen Hill	VIC ACT/Wagga	Australia	Thomas Zerna	QLD	Australia
2012	Kandis Ivas-Duncan	QLD		Lucas Tanis	VIC	Australia
2011	Kandis Ivas-Duncan	QLD		Chris Cullen	VIC	
2009	Rebecca Brewer	SA		Andrew Boylen	WA	
2008	Heather Marsh	VIC		Andrew Olechnowicz	VIC	Australia
2007	Jeska Matthews	NT	Australia	Jim Boekel	NT	Australia
2006	Kylie Guarino "Guido"	VIC	Australia	Lucas Tanis	NT	Australia
2005	Heather Marsh	NSW		Andrew Olechnowicz	VIC	Australia

=== Rookie of the Year Award ===
Award given to the best player in their first year.

Year	Women	State	Service	Men	State	Service
2024	Pani Davidson	NSW		Harrison Jones	VIC	
2023	Shanelle Tolley	QLD	Australia	Thomas Nyhouse	NT	
2022	Sophie Ackerly	QLD	Australia	Adam Kerle	QLD	Australia
2019	Georgia Roberts	QLD	Australia	Billy Hancocks	NT	Australia
2018	Georgia Joseph	NSW		Matthew Ebneter	QLD	Australia
2017	Eqxelle Evans	NT	Australia			Australia
2016	Nikkiska McGlashan	VIC/ACT	Australia	Alexander Brown	NSW	
2015	Lara Pilton	NSW		Nathan McGowan	QLD	Australia
2014	Grace Amey	QLD	Australia	Karl Turvey	QLD	Australia
2013	Leah Swain	QLD	Australia	Ben Jay	NSW	
2012	Kristen Langhorn	ACT	APS	James Rowden	SA	
2011	Erin Mrnjavac	QLD	Australia	Tomasz Szymanski	ACT	
2009	Annie Tanner	NSW		Ash Condon	NSW	
2008	Kelly Osborne	QLD	Australia	Dimitrios Papas	QLD	Australia

=== Champion Point Scorers ===
Awarded to players who tally highest points total during championships. The men's champion is awarded the Bob Shortridge Trophy. The point scoring titles ceased to be awarded after 2009.

Year	Women	State	Service	Men	State	Service
2009	Karen Hill	ACT		Andrew Olechnowicz	VIC	Australia
2008	Heather Marsh	VIC		Andrew Boylen	WA	
2007	Kate Hockings & Sarah Legg	NZ & NSW	New Zealand	Andrew Olechnowicz	VIC	Australia
2006	Jeska Matthews	NT	Australia	Andy Peate	SA	
2005	Fiona Harris	ACT		Andrew Olechnowicz	VIC	Australia
2004	Gill Rutledge	NSW		Ken Robertson "Busta"	ACT	
2003	Wendy Keogh	NSW	Australia	Aaron Marsh "Gobba"	NSW	Australia
2002	Jayne Tauschke	VIC	Australia	Dean Hill	ACT	
2001	Jayne Tauschke	VIC	Australia	Ken Robertson "Busta"	NSW	
2000	Jayne Monaghan (Tauschke)	VIC	Australia	Ken Robertson "Busta"	VIC	
1999	Jayne Monaghan (Tauschke)	NT	Australia	Ken Robertson "Busta"	VIC	
1998	Jayne Monaghan (Tauschke)	NSW	Australia	Ken Robertson "Busta"	VIC	

=== Champion Three Point Shooters ===
Three point contest held traditionally as interval between the Men's & Women's Finals Games, hosted by the Brotherhood and Sisterhood.

Year	Women	State	Service	Men	State	Service
2023	Dominique Van Zyl	QLD	Australia	Ryan Chapman	ACT	
2022						
2019	Tegan Ross	SA		Bradley Conca	QLD	
2018	Ebony Hoffmann	WA	Australia	Ashley Bell	SA	
2017	Ebony Hoffmann	NSW	Australia	Welmer Castillo	WA	
2016	Sarah Ellis	NT		Welmer Castillo	WA	
2015	Hannah Kennedy	QLD	Australia	Welmer Castillo	VIC	
2014	Shannon Cook	SA		Jim Boekel	VIC	Australia
2013				Matt Rugendyke	QLD	Australia
2012	Bethany Van Ross	QLD	Australia	Jamie Stow	SA	
2011	Candice O'Keefe	NSW		Veselin Ceranic	NT	
2009	Allyson Hurrell	NSW		Peter Liston	NSW	Australia
2008	Julie Williams	QLD	Australia	Scott Bradley	QLD	Australia
2007	Amelia Walmsley	NSW		Trent Whiston	NSW	
2006				Jim Boekel	NT	Australia
2005				Justin Manwaring	QLD	Australia
2004	Karen Herbert "Buzz"	ACT		Rob Greig	WA	
2003	Karen Herbert "Buzz"	ACT		Andy Hannah "Skylab"	VIC	Australia
2002	Bree Griffiths	QLD		Tim Muehlberg	SA	
2001	Bree Griffiths	QLD		Tim Muehlberg	SA	
2000	Jayne Monaghan (Tauschke)	VIC	Australia	Darren Martin	NSW	
1999	Jayne Monaghan (Tauschke)	NT	Australia	Matt Rugendyke	QLD	Australia
1998	Bettina Stelzer	QLD	Australia	Dean Burke "Wombat"	SA	
1997	Tamika Warke (Simmons)	VIC	Australia	Matt Rugendyke	QLD	Australia
1996	Bettina Stelzer	QLD	Australia	Dean Burke "Wombat"	SA	
1995				Brett Matthews "Lurch"	NT	

=== Major Greg "Frenchie" McDougall Award ===
Awarded to the person who demonstrates the energy, indomitable spirit, sense of fair play and enjoyment of life that the late Major Gregory John "Frenchie" McDougall displayed both on and off the court.

Year	Recipient
2025	Kandis Ivas-Duncan
2024	Jakeb Morrison
2023	Jo Mercieca "Seeka"
2022	Ruth Wicks
2019	Bettina Stelzer "Tina"
2018	Andrew Jaunutis "AJ"
2017	Chris Robson "Mr Chris"
2016	Mick Kearney "Puss/Raptor"
2015	Melissa Miller
2014	Lachlan Sorensen
2013	Dean Burke "Wombat"
2012	Bruce Ferguson "Bug"
2011	Janeter Turnbull & Tim Muehlberg
2009	Danni Stone
2008	Lucas Telley
2007	Brian Lawrie "Bill"
2006	Ken Robertson "Busta"
2005	Mary Anne Wheatley
2004	Graham Claude Joce "Jock"
2003	Chris Siegmann "Chuckie"
2002	Gill Rutledge
2001	John Van Den Hurk & Donna Puglisi
2000	Wayne Springhall "Springer"
1999	Sheralee Clarke (Gormley) & Paul Hart
1998	Geoff Toulson & Andrea Anderson (Rogers)
1997	Cath Wilsen

== Administration ==
Australian Defence Force Basketball Association is administered by the ADBA committee and is responsible to the Australian Defence Sports Council (ADSC). The ADFBA was originally formed in 1983. The first committee was established by six members. LEUT Bruce Fallon (Navy), Will Van Weedenberg (Army), MAJ Adrian Corkeron (Army), WGCDR Bob Shortridge (Air Force), SQNLDR Amanda Leslie (Air Force), and FSGT John Nordheim (Air Force).

The 2010 National Championships was disbanded following an investigation into the conduct of the 2009 Championships.

== ADFBA Official Logo ==
ADFBA Logo 1999-2012

The first ADFBA logo was designed during the 1999 Arafura Games by a committee of those attending the Games.

The ADF Sports Council recommended that the word 'Force' be removed from ADF Sports Associations. A re-branded logo as the 'ADBA' was designed by Kellie Davis and approved by the ADBA Committee meeting held at RAAF Fairbairn, Canberra ACT in 2012.

The ADFSC later retraced this decision and a refreshed ADFBA logo based on the original 1999 design was reinstalled from 2013.

== See also ==
- Australian Defence Force
- Basketball Australia
- International Basketball Federation

== Sources ==
- Australian Defence Basketball Association (ADBA)
