= Waste in the United Kingdom =

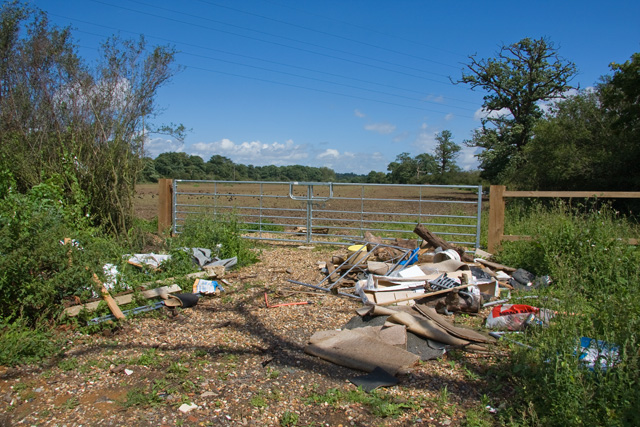
Rubbish in a farm

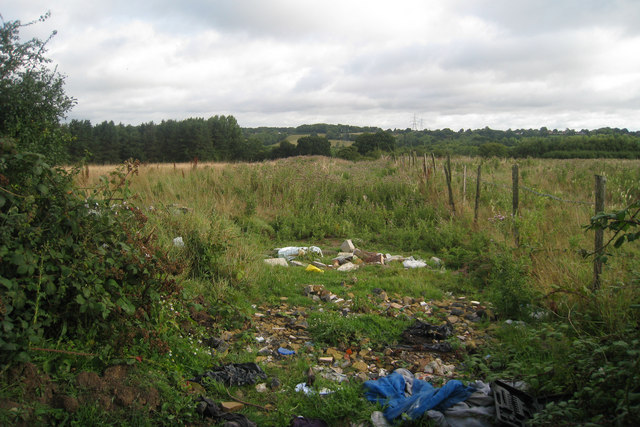
Spoiled footpath in Brede, East Sussex

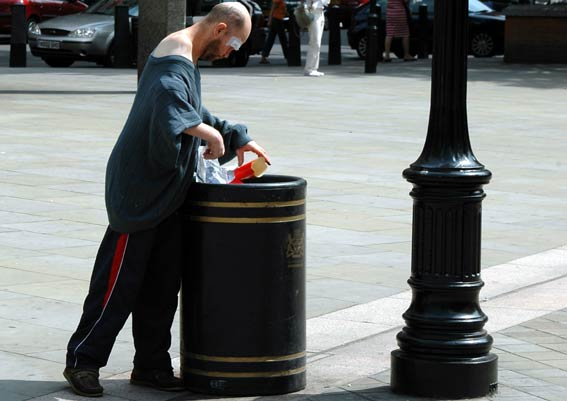
Man scavenging food in London

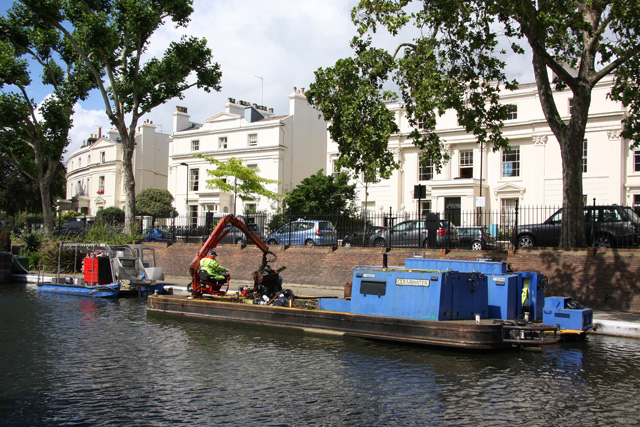
Loading garbage in Maida Vale

It is estimated that 290 million tonnes of waste was produced in the United Kingdom in 2008 but volumes are declining. In 2012 municipal solid waste generation was almost 30 million tonnes, according to Waste Atlas Platform.

The National Waste Strategy is a policy of the government, and in particular the Department for Environment, Food and Rural Affairs (Defra), intended to foster a move to sustainability in waste management within.

== Food waste ==
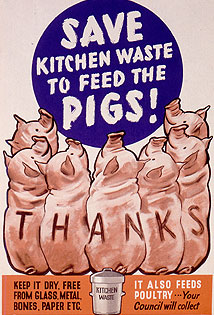
During World War II, posters advised on a number of issues, including that of food waste. By 1940, legislation was passed to make the wasting of food an offence due to the food shortages during wartime.

Since 1915, food waste has been identified as a considerable problem and has been the subject of ongoing media attention, intensifying with the launch of the "Love Food, Hate Waste" campaign in 2007. Food waste has been discussed in newspaper articles, news reports and television programmes, which have increased awareness of it as a public issue. To tackle waste issues, encompassing food waste, the government-funded "Waste & Resources Action Programme" (WRAP) was created in 2000.

The main and most common method of disposal in the United Kingdom is landfill. Other methods are also used such as Incineration and anaerobic digestion. Out of all of the waste that was from household, commercial and industrial waste, approximately 57% of the waste was distributed to waste management sites. In addition some waste from sewage sludge, mining waste, and quarrying waste are moved to landfill sites. Landfill has been the most efficient way of disposal in the UK, as of in 1994 there were approximately 4000 sites.

== Other types of waste ==
=== Household waste ===
Throughout the country, the average person generates a little over one thousand pounds of waste per year. This average varies city to city-ranging from seven hundred to slightly over thirteen hundred pounds per person a year.

=== Commercial waste ===
In the UK, all businesses and other organisations have a legal duty of care over the waste they generate. This legal responsibility was introduced in the groundbreaking Environmental Protection Act (EPA) 1990 and was recently amended by the Environment Act (EA) 2021 to provide more clarity in definitions and expand responsibilities. The duty of care stipulates that waste generated by non-domestic activities cannot be mingled with the domestic waste stream. Instead, businesses are responsible for the waste they produce until it is recovered of, or disposed of. Most businesses in the UK demonstrate compliance by obtaining a Waste Transfer Note from commercial waste collection providers. In a bid to reduce plastic waste caused by UK businesses, the government launched a plastic packaging tax on 1st April 2022.

=== Fly tipping ===
This is the illegal dumping of waste, most commonly found among roadways or abandon areas, which has been increasing and becoming a problem within parts of the UK. Household items are the most commonly found items among incidents. In 2016 there was around one million fly tipping incidents which was more than a 5% increase from the previous year. Majority of the culprits are individuals who are unwilling to pay or allocate the time to properly dispose of their waste. The most common size load was equivalent to the size of a small work van. These incidents threaten human health as it pollutes the air and harms the environment significantly. It was estimated that the cost of clearance of this waste by officials was over sixty million dollars. Penalties and regulations have become significantly more harsh in order to deal with this issue.

=== Hazardous waste ===
This waste is produced mainly from mining and minerals as well as any other unaffiliated oil or oily water. This includes substances such as asbestos, solvents, pesticides, oils etc. They account for the lowest percentage of waste accumulated in the UK, however can be the most harmful if not properly treated and managed.

== Landfills ==
Landfills in the United Kingdom are historically very important resources for waste disposal. As it was so important it has become excessively used to the point where some landfills are at capacity. This is because before the 1980s, the UK government previously used the “dilute and disperse” method of waste. The UK is now looking for options to reduce the levels of their landfill sites through legislation. This is a United Kingdom national strategy of which member states set up methods to target biodegradable materials in landfills. These methods include and are mainly composed of recycling, composting, and biogas production.

== Waste to energy ==
There are a number of Waste-to-energy power plants in the United Kingdom, especially in England. Notable plants include:

- England
  - Allington Quarry Waste Management Facility
  - Belvedere Incinerator
  - Derwenthaugh Coke Works
  - Glanford Power Station
  - Kirklees Incinerator
  - Newburn Steelworks
  - Newhaven Incinerator
  - Ottovale coke works
  - Stoke Incinerator
  - Teesside EfW plant
  - Tyseley Energy from Waste Plant
  - Whinfield Power Station
- Isle of Man
  - Isle of Man Incinerator
- Isle of Wight
  - Isle of Wight gasification facility
- Scotland
  - Longannet power station, Scotland

== Waste by country ==
=== Scotland ===
In Scotland in 1993, 14 million tons of waste was produced. 100,000 tons was toxic waste and 260,000 tons was controlled waste from other parts of Britain and abroad. 45% of the special waste was in liquid form and 18% was asbestos - radioactive waste was not included. Of the controlled waste, 48% came from the demolition of buildings, 22% from industry, 17% from households and 13% from business - only 3% were recycled. Ninety per cent of controlled waste was buried in landfill sites and produced 2 million tons of methane gas. 1.5% was burned in incinerators and 1.5% were exported to be disposed of or recycled. There are 900 disposal sites in Scotland.

There are very few vacant or derelict land sites in the north east of Scotland, as there are few traditional heavy industries or coal/mineral extraction sites. However some areas are contaminated by aromatic hydrocarbons (500.25 cubic meters).

== Notable waste issues ==
- The Bawtry gasworks contamination involved the contamination of land at Bawtry, South Yorkshire, England with hazardous by-products from the manufacture of coal gas.
- The Spodden Valley asbestos controversy arose in May 2004 when approximately 72 acres (290,000 m2) of land in Spodden Valley in Rochdale, England, formerly used by Turner Brothers Asbestos Company (later known as Turner & Newall), and the site of the world's largest asbestos textile factory, was sold to MMC Estates, a property developer.

== See also ==
- Don't let Devon go to waste
- List of incinerators in the United Kingdom
- New Technologies Demonstrator Programme
- Waste by country
- Clearabee
- International Waste#United Kingdom
