= Fishing industry in England =

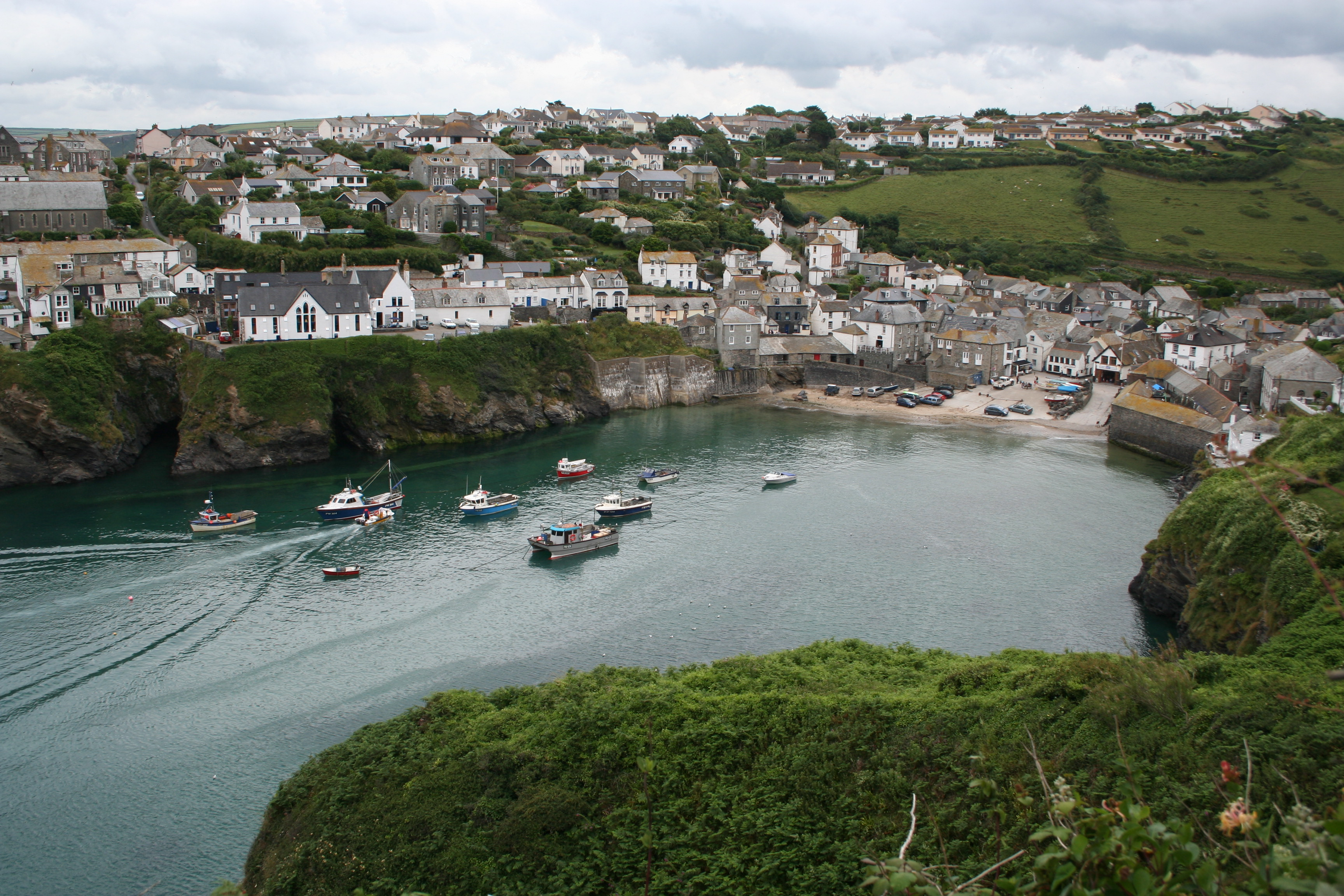
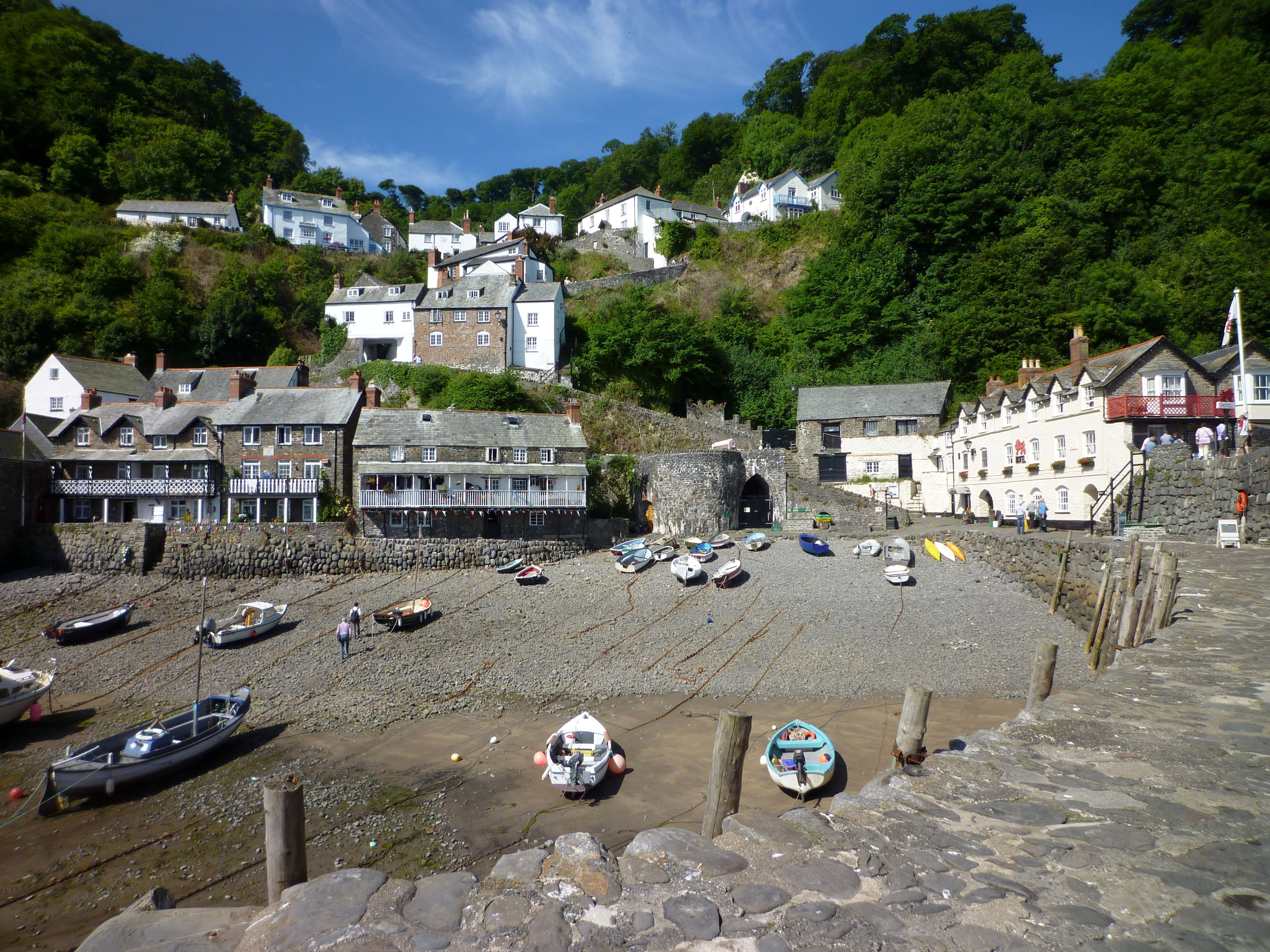
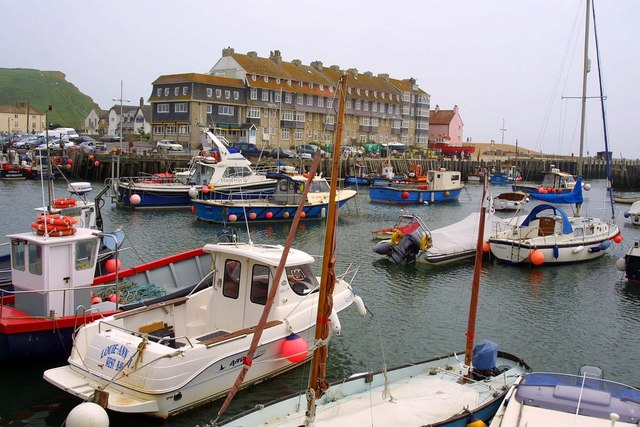
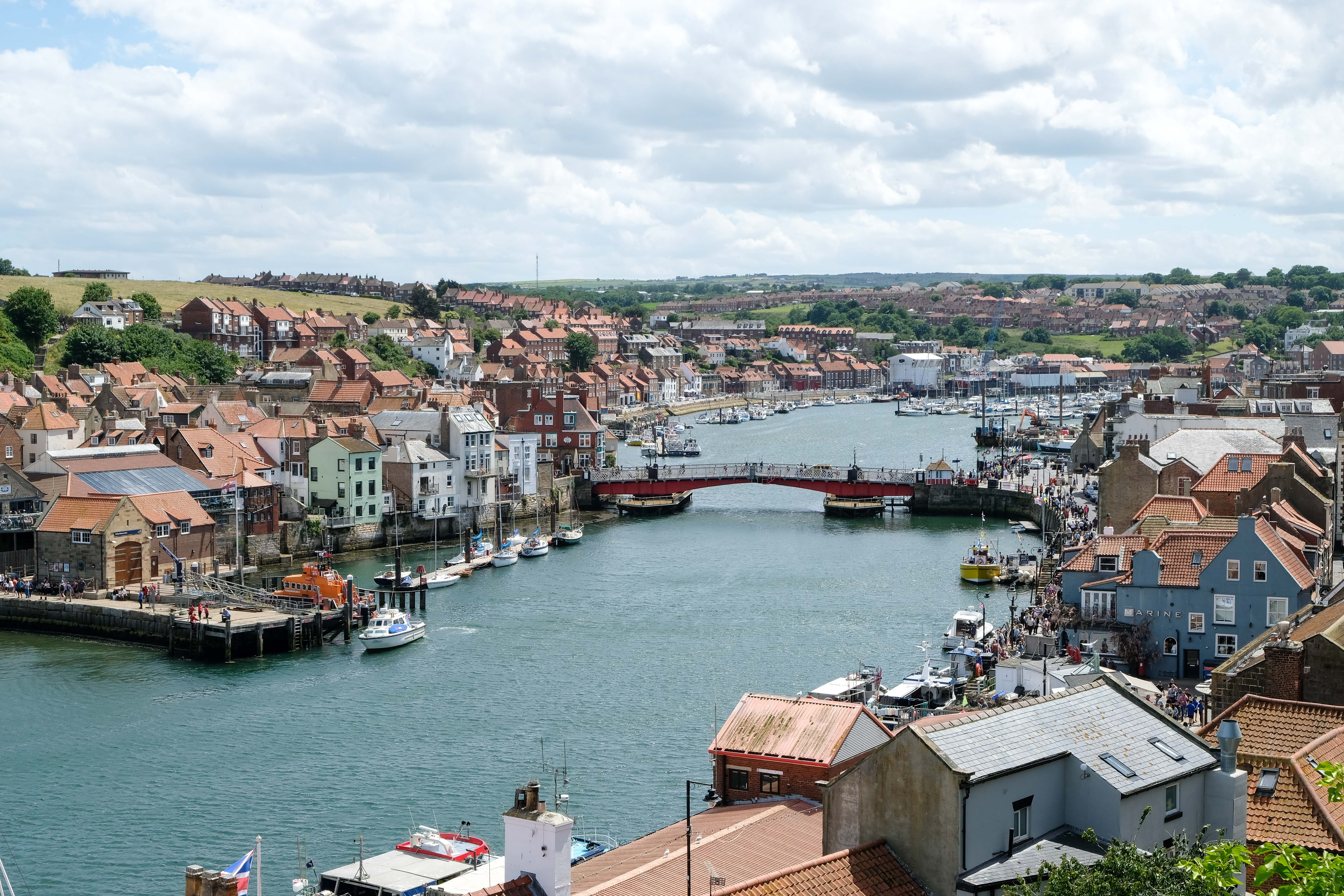
Examples of fishing villages in England: Port Isaac in Cornwall, Clovelly in Devon, West Bay in Dorset, and Whitby in North Yorkshire

The fishing industry in England comprises a significant proportion of the UK's fishing industry. England retains a large but reduced fishing industry. Its fleets bring home fish of every kind, ranging from sole to herring.

The UK fishing industry contributed £446 million in 2019 in terms of GVA); this represents 0.02% of the UK's total GVA. Updated statistics from Marine Management Organisation on the UK fishing sector show that UK vessels landed 724 thousand tonnes of sea fish in 2017, with a value of £980 million. In 2021, 53% of fishers in the UK were based in England. The largest English region was the South West, contributing 10% of overall output in the sector.

The fishing industry in England catches a variety of different fish and seafood, including North Sea Cod, North Sea Whiting, North Sea Haddock, Southern Sea Crab, West of Scotland Nephrops and Eastern English Channel Scallops. The Department for Environment, Food and Rural Affairs is the government department responsible for fisheries in England.

== Geographical spread of ports ==
Important English seafishing ports include:

- Brixham
- Fleetwood – home of the Fisherman's Friend
- Grimsby – once the largest fishing port in the world
- Lowestoft
- Newlyn
- Whitby
- Kingston upon Hull

== History ==
The fishing industry in England was once one of the largest in the world. As a response to declining stocks, the Common Fisheries Policy imposed quotas on the amount of catch permitted to be brought ashore. This prevented a collapse in the industry and cod has since been reclassified as sustainable.

== Fish processing ==
Fish processing companies are based in Grimsby (Young's Bluecrest), Whitby (Whitby Seafoods) and Lowestoft (Birds Eye).

== Organisations ==
=== Regulation ===
The Marine Management Organisation implements the sea fisheries legislation in England.

=== Industry organisations ===
The National Fishing Heritage Centre in Grimsby displays how the fishing industry in England once was. Also in Grimsby is the Sea Fish Industry Authority (SeaFish) which promotes the consumption of fish, and conducts research for the fishing and fish-processing industry. The Fishermen's Mission is a Christian charity supporting fishermen and their families.

== See also ==
- Cod Wars
- Economy of England
- Fishing in Cornwall
- Yorkshire coast fishery
- Brighton Fishing Museum
