= Fisheries Museum =

Fisheries Museum or Fishing Museum may refer to:

- Brighton Fishing Museum
- Destin History & Fishing Museum
- Fisheries and Maritime Museum, Esbjerg
- German Hunting and Fishing Museum
- Fishing Museum, Hel
- Fishing Museum, Palamós
- North Shore Commercial Fishing Museum
- Sebastian Fishing Museum
- Scottish Fisheries Museum
