= Animal and Plant Health Agency =

Executive agency in the United Kingdom

Animal and Plant Health Agency Welsh: Asiantaeth Iechyd Anifeiliaid a Phlanhigion

Agency overview
- Formed: 2014
- Preceding agency: Animal Health and Veterinary Laboratories Agency
- Jurisdiction: Great Britain
- Headquarters: Addlestone, Surrey; 51.3535°N 0.4937°W
- Employees: 2,300
- Annual budget: £90.2 million fiscal year 2018/19
- Agency executive: Richard Lewis, Chief Executive
- Parent department: Department for Environment, Food and Rural Affairs
- Website: gov.uk/apha

The Animal and Plant Health Agency (APHA), formerly known as the Animal Health and Veterinary Laboratories Agency (AHVLA), is an executive agency of the Department for Environment, Food and Rural Affairs (Defra) of the United Kingdom.

It was formed in its current state on 1 October 2014, when AHVLA was expanded by adding parts of the Food and Environment Research Agency (FERA), including the Plant Health and Seeds Inspectorate (PHSI). AHVLA had originally been established on 1 April 2011 by a merger of two former agencies, Animal Health and the Veterinary Laboratories Agency.

The agency's main task is to protect the health and welfare of animals, as well as the general public, from disease. It conducts work across Great Britain on behalf of Defra, the Scottish Government and the Welsh Government.

The agency's total expenditure for the fiscal year 2016/17 was £217.3 million. This was offset by operating income of £62.6 million giving net expenditure of £154.7 million.

== See also ==
- National Office of Animal Health
