= Rural Development Service =

The Rural Development Service (RDS) was formerly part of the UK Government's Department for Environment, Food and Rural Affairs (Defra). It ceased to exist on 1 October 2006 following the creation of Natural England.

== History ==
The RDS was created in 2001, when the Farming and Rural Conservation Agency merged with the then Ministry of Agriculture, Fisheries and Food's regional service centres.

The body was charged with the implementation of the England Rural Development Programme (ERDP), as well as a range of other rural services, placing the agency at the forefront of change in rural areas. The RDS employed 1,500, working with rural partners and local people to improve the environment, promote the conservation of wildlife and biodiversity and develop stronger rural economies and communities.

Following a review by Christopher Haskins, enacted in the Natural Environment and Rural Communities 2006 in March 2006, the agri-environment element of the RDS was integrated with English Nature and most of the Countryside Agency on 1 October 2006 to form Natural England. Smaller elements of the RDS went to the State Veterinary Service and the Regional Development Agency in each English region.
