= Isle of Wight gasification facility =

Coordinates: 50.705°N 1.335°W

The Isle of Wight gasification facility is a municipal waste treatment plant in Newport, Isle of Wight. It entered the commissioning phase in autumn 2008, and was replaced by a moving grate incinerator in 2019.

The facility has been funded as part of Defra's New Technologies Demonstrator Programme and is one of the first and only facilities in the United Kingdom to be classed as a gasification system employed for the combustion of refuse derived fuel originating from municipal waste. The plant is operated by Waste Gas Technology UK Ltd, part of the ENER·G group, and utilises the Energos technology; Energos is also part of the ENER·G group. The Energos system was retrofitted into a small conventional incinerator plant and combust an estimated 30,000 tonnes of refuse-derived fuel per year. Originally estimated at £8 million, the retrofit cost £10 million to commission, £2.7 million of which was funded by DEFRA.

== Temporary suspension of operation, 2010 ==
Due to increased dioxin emission levels detected in March 2010 exceeding 8 times the legal limit, operation was temporarily suspended spring 2010. The flue gas cleaning system of the old incinerator was reused in the retrofit, and ENER·G reported this system to be the cause of the problem. Following modifications and several startup attempts, it has been operating again since October 2010.

In June 2011, the Isle of Wight council decided to make radical efforts to lessen its dependence on the gasification facility with reference to its history of limited reliability.

== Permanent closure 2017 ==
The facility was permanently closed in 2017 after repeated breakdowns and breached emissions levels, and replaced by a conventional grate-fired waste-to-energy facility.

== Energos technology ==
The Energos system includes a close coupled combustion stage which, as configured, uses all the syngas in the combustion stage. It is thus not able to produce syngas for external use and therefore sometimes categorized as two-stage combustion. The process enables improved control of the combustion to minimise the formation of combustion related emissions such as oxides of nitrogen (NOx), Carbon Monoxide (CO) and Total Organic Carbons (TOC). Operating plants achieve average annual NOx emissions of 25 – 30% of the EU limit using just process control and without the need for either Selective Non Catalytic Reduction (SNCR) or Selective Catalytic Reduction (SCR), whilst at the same time achieving very low CO and TOC emissions.

The energy in the combustion is converted into steam. Energos plants produce steam at lower temperature and pressure than modern waste incinerators, and thus achieve low energy-efficiencies compared to incinerators. As a CHP or heat delivery plant, the cycle efficiency is approaching 85%. One such example is the recently constructed Sarpsborg 2 plant, which provides process steam to the Borregaard Chemical Plant, directly displacing heavy fuel oil.

The Isle of Wight plant was intended to debut a new furnace design for the Energos process aimed at increased combustion efficiency, dust removal and enabling less interruptions and downtime than the earlier design.

== See also ==
- Incineration
- Gasification
- Gasifier
- Pyrolysis
- Thermal treatment
