= Veterinary Laboratories Agency =

UK animal health laboratory and former executive agency

The Veterinary Laboratories Agency (VLA) was an executive agency of the UK government's Department for Environment, Food and Rural Affairs (DEFRA). It carried out animal disease surveillance, diagnostic services and veterinary scientific research for government and commercial organisations. It was based in New Haw, though had offices and laboratories around the country, such as in Sutton Bonington.

It was both an International Reference Laboratory and the EU Community Reference Laboratory for avian influenza.

== History ==
1894 – The Central Veterinary Laboratory (CVL) is established in a small basement room in Whitehall, London to deal with a swine fever epidemic.
1917 – The Laboratory moves to its current location in Weybridge. The site is still known as Weybridge today, although the postal address is now Addlestone.

== Merger with Animal Health ==
On 29 June 2010 DEFRA announced that the VLA would be merged with Animal Health. The merger was completed on 1 April 2011, forming the Animal and Plant Health Agency.
