= National Office of Animal Health =

British animal health organisation

- Location: Enfield, England, UK

The National Office of Animal Health (NOAH) is a British organisation that represents the voice of its members from within the animal medicine industry in the United Kingdom of Great Britain and Northern Ireland.

== Mission statement ==
NOAH’s aim is to: “... promote the benefits of safe, effective, quality medicines for the health and welfare of all animals.”

== Membership and committees ==
The members of NOAH typically come from a broad spectrum of the animal and veterinary medicine industry including small UK organisations and larger multinational corporations who have interests in providing animal medicine and services to animal health in the UK.

Committees exist within NOAH formed from its various members, each focusing on specific animal health and welfare concerns.

== Objectives ==
The principal objectives of NOAH apart from those stated in its mission statement include working as a consultative body for the UK government on matters pertaining to animal health and medicine, as well as being an influential and respected force in matters of legislation around the industry. They are also keen to provide information on animal health, welfare and medicines to the industry and the public alike.

=== Informing UK government and the animal medicines industry ===
NOAH is often cited as a resource on the Government of the United Kingdom websites and across industry practitioners where the information that they provide is highly valuable. The NOAH Compendium is a collection of datasheets on the majority of animal medicine, health and welfare topics such as The Safety of Food from Animals and Antibiotics for Animals.

The NOAH Compendium database can also be searched by active ingredient, manufacturer name, animal species and therapeutic indication. The database allows the user to drill down into specific medicines to find the manufacturer details (including address and contact information), product names, their uses and their ingredients.

=== Pet health information for the public ===
NOAH also runs a public-facing website called Pet Health Information that is set up to provide pet health care information such as that which can help pet owners tackle issues such as dog health (specifically worms in dogs such as hookworms, tapeworms and roundworms parasites), the cat flea and mites in the domestic rabbit as well as the general health of birds, fish, degus, chinchillas, ferrets, gerbils, hamsters, rats and guinea pigs.

The website’s stated aim is to provide a ‘a one stop source’ featuring a wealth of animal health information and advice to help owners and potential owners to make decisions about their pets' health care. To help the site fulfil this aim, Pet Health Information allows visitors to use a Vet Q&A, read a blog, search for local vets and pet shops as well as subscribe to a newsletter providing further information about pet health care.

== See also ==
- Medicines and Healthcare products Regulatory Agency (UK)
- Cattle Health Initiative (UK)
- Department for Environment, Food and Rural Affairs (Defra - UK)
- Animal welfare in the United Kingdom
