= Marine and Fisheries Agency =

- Abbreviation: MFA
- Successor: Marine Management Organisation
- Formation: 1 October 2005
- Dissolved: 1 April 2010; 16 years ago
- Type: Executive agency of the British Government
- Purpose: Control sea fishing in waters around England and Wales
- Budget: £27 million (2009)
- Formerly called: Marine Fisheries Agency

The Marine and Fisheries Agency (MFA) was an executive agency of the British government, founded on 1 October 2005, that controlled sea fishing in seas around England and Wales. Responsibilities included enforcement of sea fisheries legislation, licensing of UK commercial fishing vessels, sampling of fish catches, management of UK fisheries quotas and an advisory role and general liaison with the fishing industry. It received over £27 million in funding in 2009 and was replaced by the Marine Management Organisation on 1 April 2010.

Formerly "Marine Fisheries Agency", the Marine and Fisheries Agency had a wide range of responsibilities and undertook delivery functions for Defra in a number of areas.

In England and Wales, the Agency had overall responsibility for the enforcement of the European Union's Common Fisheries Policy (CFP) and associated regulations. English and Welsh waters within British Fishery Limits covered approximately 60,000 square miles (160,000 km^{2}) and extended up to 200 miles (320 km) from the coast, or to the meridian line with other EU Member States' waters, where the distance between the countries is less than 200 miles (320 km). In 2007, according to MFA statistics, there were 12,729 active fishermen using 2,673 vessels in the UK.

In 2009 the Marine and Fisheries Agency were part of an expert advisory group during a report into UK offshore wind farms and their potential disruption to commercial fishing activities. The report cited statistics provided by the Marine Fisheries Agency and concluded that there should be early consultation between offshore wind farm developers and fishermen during the planning process.

== See also ==
- Scottish Fisheries Protection Agency
- Overfishing
