= Landfill Directive =

1999 European Union directive

Directive
- European Union directive
- Title: Landfill Directive
- Made by: Council of the European Union
- Made under: Article 130s
- Journal reference: L 182, 16 July 1999, pp. 1–19

History
- Date made: 26 April 1999
- Entry into force: 16 July 1999
- Implementation date: 16 July 2001

Other legislation
- Amended by: Regulation (EC) No 1882/2003

The Landfill Directive, more formally Council Directive 1999/31/EC of 26 April 1999, is a European Union directive which regulates waste management of landfills in the European Union. It was to be implemented by EU Member States by 16 July 2001. Directive (EU) 2018/850 amended the 1999 directive with effect from 5 July 2020.

The Directive's overall aim is "to prevent or reduce as far as possible negative effects on the environment, in particular the pollution of surface water, groundwater, soil and air, and on the global environment, including the greenhouse effect, as well as any resulting risk to human health, from the landfilling of waste, during the whole life-cycle of the landfill". This legislation also has important implications for waste handling and waste disposal.

== Outline ==
The Directive is applicable to all waste disposal sites and divides them into three classes:

- landfills for hazardous waste
- landfills for non-hazardous waste
- landfills for inert waste

Waste disposal into landfills is restricted by banning certain waste types, which may pose a risk. The following wastes may not be disposed of in a landfill and must either be recovered, recycled or disposed of in other ways.

- liquid waste
- flammable waste
- explosive or oxidising waste
- hospital and other clinical waste which is infectious
- used tyres, with certain exceptions
- any other type of waste which does not meet the acceptance criteria laid down in Annex II.

To avoid further risks, allowed wastes are subject to a standard waste acceptance procedure, which dictates the following terms:

- waste must be treated before being landfilled
- hazardous waste within the meaning of the Directive must be assigned to a hazardous waste landfill
- landfills for non-hazardous waste must be used for municipal waste and for non-hazardous waste
- landfill sites for inert waste must be used only for inert waste
- criteria for the acceptance of waste at each landfill class must be adopted by the Commission in accordance with the general principles of Annex II.

The acceptance criteria and the acceptance process are further specified in the Council Decision 2003/33/EC.

== Implementation ==
Member States must report to the European Commission every three years on the implementation of the Directive. According to the Directive, the amount of biodegradable municipal waste must be reduced to 50% in 2009 and to 35% in 2016 (compared to 1995 levels).

In 2009, 10 years after the enactment of the Landfill Directive, the European Environment Agency published a report, which closely analysed the progress on implementing the Directive in the Member States. Its close analysis focuses on five countries and one sub-national region: Estonia, Finland, the Flemish Region of Belgium, Germany, Hungary and Italy. According to this report, significant progress has been made, largely due to two core factors:

- setting medium- and long-term targets for reducing landfilling enabled Member States to define waste strategies and monitor their progress continuously.
- the directive's flexibility allowed Member States to try out different policies and adapt and adjust approaches "to match national and regional realities".

== See also ==
- Waste Implementation Programme, the United Kingdom programme to achieve the targets of the Landfill Directive
- List of European Union directives
