= Waste Implementation Programme =

The Waste Implementation Programme (WIP) was the UK Government's response to the package of strategic measures recommended by the Strategy Unit "Waste Not, Want Not" report published in 2002. The WIP was the route map of the Department for Environment, Food and Rural Affairs, aimed at delivering the action required to meet the UK's legally binding targets under Article Five of the EU Landfill Directive related to reducing levels of biodegradable waste that are landfilled.

The UK's targets were:

- By 2010 reduce biodegradable municipal waste landfilled to 75% of that produced in 1995
- By 2013 reduce biodegradable municipal waste landfilled to 50% of that produced in 1995
- By 2020 reduce biodegradable municipal waste landfilled to 35% of that produced in 1995

== See also ==
- New Technologies Demonstrator Programme
