= Animal Health =

Former executive agency in the UK

Animal Health Logo

Animal Health was a UK government executive agency primarily responsible for ensuring that farmed animals in Great Britain were healthy, disease-free and well looked after.

One of its key roles was to implement government policies aimed at preventing or managing outbreaks of serious animal diseases. In doing so, it supported the farming industry, protected the welfare of farmed animals and safeguarded public health from animal-borne diseases.

In England and Wales, it also worked to protect public health by ensuring that dairy hygiene and egg production standards were met.

It regulated the trade in endangered species through CITES.

Previously, Animal Health was also known as State Veterinary Service.

The Scottish arm of the organisation was a member of SEARS (Scotland's Environmental and Rural Services).

On 1 April 2011, it merged with the Veterinary Laboratories Agency to form the Animal and Plant Health Agency.

== See also ==
- Veterinary medicine
- National Office of Animal Health
