= Department for Environment, Food and Rural Affairs =

Ministerial department of the UK Government

Department overview
- Formed: 2001; 25 years ago
- Preceding agencies: Ministry of Agriculture, Fisheries and Food; Department of the Environment, Transport and the Regions
- Jurisdiction: Government of the United Kingdom
- Headquarters: 2 Marsham Street, London
- Annual budget: £2.2 billion (current) & £400 million (capital) for 2011-12
- Secretary of State responsible: Angela Eagle MP, Secretary of State for Environment, Food and Rural Affairs
- Department executives: Paul Kissack, Permanent Secretary; Nick Joicey, Second Permanent Secretary and Group Chief Operating Officer
- Child agencies: Animal and Plant Health Agency; Centre for Environment, Fisheries and Aquaculture Science; Rural Payments Agency; Veterinary Medicines Directorate
- Website: gov.uk/defra

- Applies to: England; United Kingdom (some reserved matters)
- Relates to: Environment, food, agriculture, fisheries and rural communities in England

Other UK counterparts
- Northern Ireland: Department of Agriculture, Environment and Rural Affairs
- Scotland: Environment and Forestry Directorate
- Wales: Welsh Government

The Department for Environment, Food and Rural Affairs (Defra) is a ministerial department of the government of the United Kingdom. The department is responsible for environmental protection, food production and standards, agriculture, fisheries and rural communities in England. Concordats set out agreed frameworks for cooperation, between it and the Scottish Government, Welsh Government, and Northern Ireland Executive, which have devolved responsibilities for these matters in their respective nations.

Defra also leads for the United Kingdom on agricultural, fisheries and environmental matters in international negotiations on sustainable development and climate change, although a new Department of Energy and Climate Change was created on 3 October 2008 to take over the last responsibility, which was later transferred to the Department for Business, Energy and Industrial Strategy following Theresa May's appointment as Prime Minister in July 2016.

== Creation ==
The department was formed in June 2001, under the leadership of Margaret Beckett, when the Ministry of Agriculture, Fisheries and Food (MAFF) was merged with part of the Department of Environment, Transport and the Regions (DETR) and with a small part of the Home Office.

It was created after the perceived failure of MAFF to deal adequately with an outbreak of Foot and Mouth disease. The department had about 9,000 core personnel, as of January 2008.

In October 2008, the climate team at Defra was merged with the energy team from the Department for Business Enterprise and Regulatory Reform (BERR), to create the Department of Energy and Climate Change, then headed by Ed Miliband.

== Ministers ==
Defra ministers are as follows, with cabinet members in bold:

Minister	Portrait	Office	Portfolio
**Angela Eagle** MP		Secretary of State for Environment, Food and Rural Affairs	Budget, including Official; Development Assistance (ODA); international relations; senior appointments; economic growth
Emma Hardy MP		Minister of State for Water and Flooding	Water reform and delivery; environmental governance, including the Environmental Improvement Plan; flooding and emergencies; waste, resources and the circular economy; chemicals and air quality; sponsorship of the Office for Environmental; Protection (OEP), Environment Agency, the New Water Regulator and Consumer Council for Water (CCW)
Jenny Riddell-Carpenter MP		Parliamentary Under-Secretary of State for Nature, Coasts and Rural Affairs	Planning and land use; protected landscapes; rural communities; climate adaptation; international biodiversity; access to nature; tree planting and forestry; green finance; domestic biodiversity; sponsorship of Natural England, Forestry Commission, Royal Botanic Gardens, Kew and the Joint Nature Conservation Committee (JNCC)
Stephen Morgan MP		Parliamentary Under-Secretary of State for Food, Fisheries and Farming	Farming and food; marine and fisheries; science and innovation; animal welfare (farmed animals); net zero; sponsorship of the Rural Payments Agency (RPA), Agriculture and Horticulture Development Board (AHDB), Marine Management Organisation (MMO), Centre for Environment, Fisheries and Aquaculture Science (Cefas) and Sea Fish Industry Authority
Sue Hayman, Baroness Hayman of Ullock		Parliamentary Under-Secretary of State for Biosecurity, Borders and Animals	Trade; EU and Sanitary and Phytosanitary (SPS) Agreement; Northern Ireland and Windsor Framework; animal welfare (companion and wild animals); biosecurity; borders; veterinary reform; pesticides; corporate services; statutory instrument programme oversight; sponsorship of the Animal and Plant Health Agency (APHA) and Veterinary Medicines Directorate (VMD)

The permanent secretary is Paul Kissack.

== Responsibilities ==
Defra is responsible for British Government policy in the following areas:

- Adaptation to global warming
- Agriculture
- Air quality
- Animal health and animal welfare
- Biodiversity
- Conservation
- Chemical substances and pesticides
- Fisheries
- Flooding
- Food
- Forestry
- Hunting
- Inland waterways
- Land management
- Marine policy
- National parks
- Noise
- Plant health
- Rural development
- Sustainable development
- Trade and the environment
- Waste management
- Water management

Some policies apply to England alone due to devolution, while others are not devolved and therefore apply to the United Kingdom as a whole.

== Executive agencies ==
The department's executive agencies are:

- Animal and Plant Health Agency (formerly the Animal Health and Veterinary Laboratories Agency, formed by a merger of Animal Health and the Veterinary Laboratories Agency, and later parts of the Food and Environment Research Agency. Animal Health had launched on 2 April 2007 and was formerly the State Veterinary Service)
- Centre for Environment, Fisheries and Aquaculture Science
- Rural Payments Agency
- Veterinary Medicines Directorate

== Key delivery partners ==
The department's key delivery partners are:

- Agriculture and Horticulture Development Board
- Consumer Council for Water
- Environment Agency
- Fera Science (formerly the Food and Environment Research Agency, now a company in which Defra holds a 25% stake)
- Forestry Commission (a non-ministerial government department including Forest Enterprise and Forest Research)
- Groceries Code Adjudicator
- Joint Nature Conservation Committee
- Marine Management Organisation (launched on 1 April 2010, incorporates the former Marine and Fisheries Agency)
- National Forest Company
- Natural England (launched on 11 October 2006, formerly English Nature and elements of the Countryside Agency and the Rural Development Service)
- Office for Environmental Protection
- Ofwat (a non-ministerial government department formally known as the Water Services Regulation Authority)
- Royal Botanic Gardens, Kew
- Sea Fish Industry Authority

A full list of departmental delivery and public bodies may be found on the Defra website.

== Defra in England ==
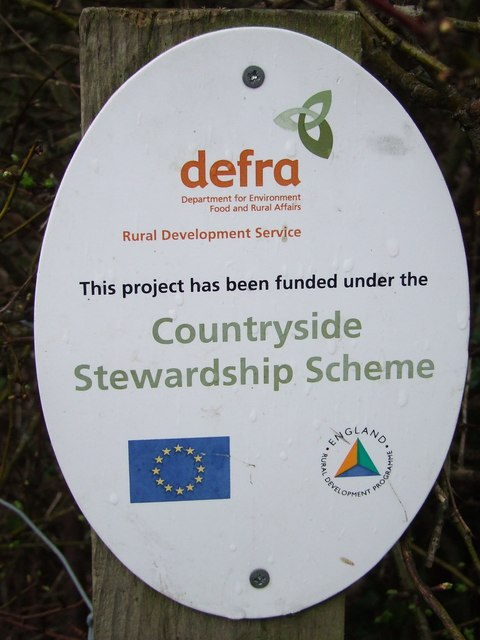
A Countryside Stewardship Scheme sign near a new stile a Cratfield, Suffolk

Policies for environment, food and rural affairs are delivered in the regions by Defra's executive agencies and delivery bodies, in particular Natural England, the Rural Payments Agency, Animal Health, and the Marine Management Organisation.

Defra provides grant aid to the following flood and coastal erosion risk management operating authorities:

- Environment Agency
- Internal drainage boards
- Local authorities

== Aim and strategic priorities ==
Defra's overarching aim is sustainable development, which is defined as "development which enables all people throughout the world to satisfy their basic needs and enjoy a better quality of life without compromising the quality of life of future generations". The Secretary of State wrote in a letter to the Prime Minister that he saw Defra's mission as enabling a move toward what the World Wide Fund for Nature (WWF) has called "one planet living".

Under this overarching aim, Defra has five strategic priorities:

- Climate change and energy.
- Sustainable consumption and production, including responsibility for the National Waste Strategy.
- Protecting the countryside and natural resource protection.
- Sustainable rural communities.
- A sustainable farming and food sector including animal health and welfare.

Defra aims to procure a significant proportion of the goods and services it requires from small and medium-sized enterprises (SMEs) in line with government policy on the SME agenda, and has also encouraged its major contractors to engage with SMEs.

Defra's headquarters are at 2, Marsham Street, London. It is also located at Nobel House, 17, Smith Square, London.

== See also ==
- Agriculture in the United Kingdom
- Air Quality Expert Group
- Badger culling in the United Kingdom
- Cattle Health Initiative
- Department of Agriculture and Rural Development (Northern Ireland)
- Energy policy in the United Kingdom
- Energy use and conservation in the United Kingdom
- Environmental contract
- List of atmospheric dispersion models
- National Bee Unit
- National Collection of Plant Pathogenic Bacteria
- New Technologies Demonstrator Programme
- Nicola Spence
- Scottish Executive Environment and Rural Affairs Department
- UK Dispersion Modelling Bureau
- United Kingdom budget
- Waste Implementation Programme
