= Clearabee =

British waste management company

- Company type: Privately held company
- Industry: Waste management
- Founded: 2012; 14 years ago
- Founders: Daniel Long and Rob Linton
- Headquarters: Birmingham, UK
- Number of locations: 175
- Area served: United Kingdom
- Products: Waste removal
- Brands: Clearabee, Beebag, Waste Express, Junk.London
- Number of employees: 380 (2022)
- Website: www.clearabee.co.uk

Clearabee is the UK's largest on-demand bulky waste management company. The company is headquartered in Birmingham and has 175 additional locations throughout Britain. Clearabee is accredited by the Living Wage Foundation.

== History ==
In February 2012, Clearabee was founded with an initial investment of £500 by Rob Linton and Daniel Long. The company launched its on-demand waste management service in February 2013.

In June 2015, the company opened its 15th location in Edinburgh, the new location allowed the company to operate across mainland Britain and Northern Ireland. That same year, it was reported that the company had cleared waste from over 30,000 customers and reached £4.1m in revenue.

Clearabee ranked #258 on the 2018 Inc. 5000 with €7.6M in revenue for 2016 operating from over 60 locations, rising to 175 locations and a turnover in excess of £23m by 2021

In April 2018 Clearabee was named in the Financial Times FT1000 list of the fastest growing companies in Europe ranking at number 70 for the whole of Europe and number 17 in the UK with three year revenue growth of 1,578% and Compound Annual Growth rate of 156%.
