= Whitby Seafoods =

Frozen seafood business based in Whitby, North Yorkshire

Whitby Seafoods Limited
- Type: Private
- Industry: Seafood processing
- Founded: 6 December 1984
- Founder: Graham Whittle
- Headquarters: Whitby, North Yorkshire, England
- Products: Scampi
- Operating income: £4.7 million (2024)
- Number of employees: 400
- Website: whitby-seafoods.com

Whitby Seafoods Limited is an independent, family owned and managed business based in Whitby, North Yorkshire, England specialising in frozen seafood products coated in batter and breadcrumbs. The company claims that it is the largest scampi factory in the world, turning out more than a million portions of the seafood dish per week.

== History ==
Whitby Seafoods was founded in 1985 when owner, Graham Whittle bought the then defunct Whitby Shellfish Company and set out to transform the British breaded scampi industry moving premises to a 40,000 square feet (3,716 m^{2}) factory on the outskirts of Whitby.

Graham retired as managing director in October 2015 and was succeeded in the role by his son, Daniel, who alongside his sister, Laura Whittle (Sales and marketing director), and brother, Edward Whittle (Business Development Director) now lead the business.

== Acquisitions ==
Whitby Seafoods acquired Middleton Seafood's (2007) and Rockall (2011) in Kilkeel, Northern Ireland, consolidating these into Kilkeel Seafoods in 2011. Galloway Seafoods, (Newton Stewart, Scotland) from ScoFro.

== Activities ==
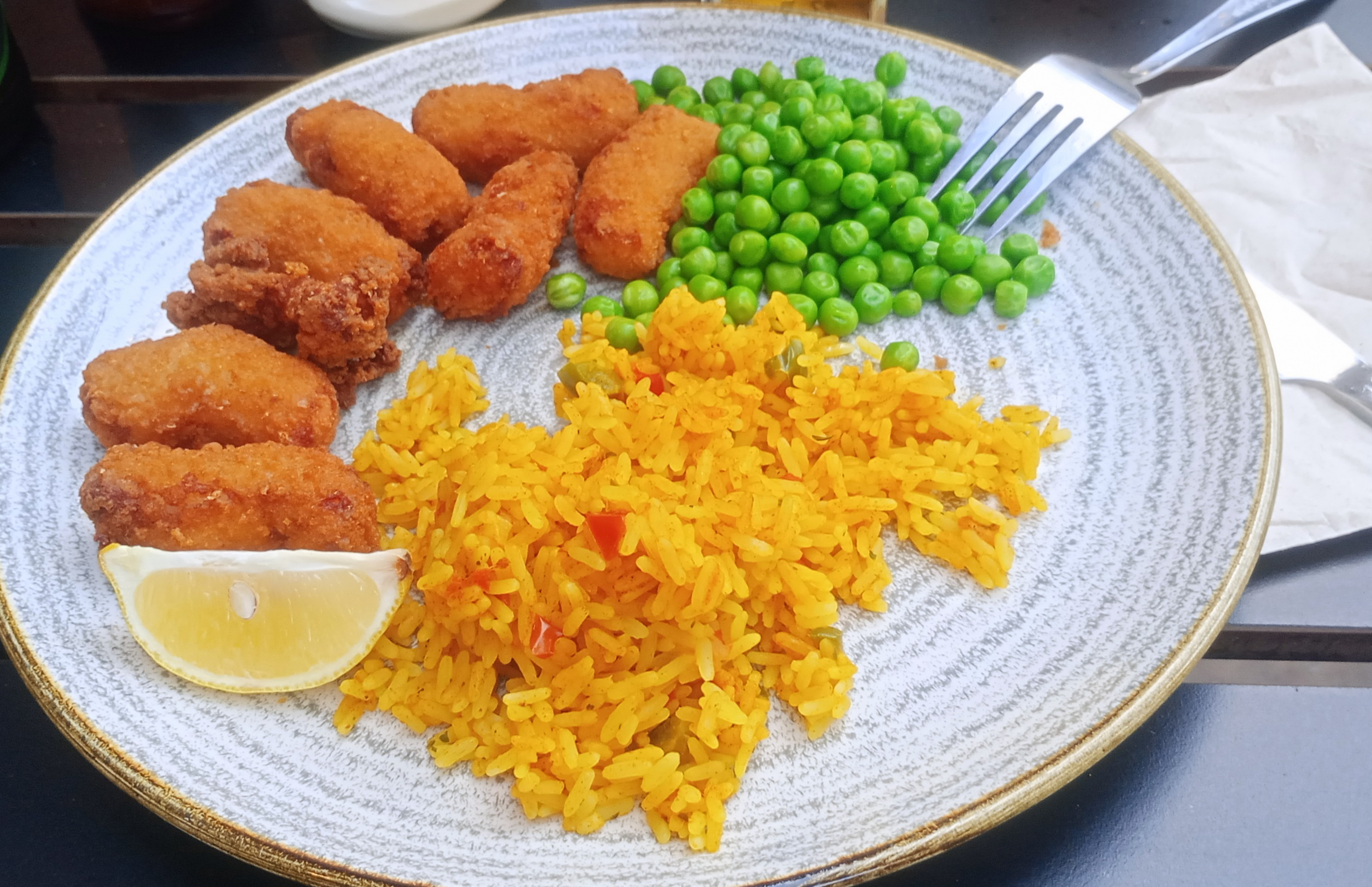
Whitby scampi served with spicy ruce and garden peas in a pub

The company is the largest manufacturer of scampi in Britain, and also claims to be the largest in the world. Whitby Seafoods processes 7635 tonnes of scampi per annum with sales of £53 million in 2017. Whitby Seafoods launched its products in 20 stores of a major British supermarket in 2008. This was expanded into 700 stores of the same retailer in 2012. In 2014 Whitby Seafoods underwent a major rebranding with advertising company Big Fish, introducing Graham The Gull as mascot and the tag line ‘Bloomin Special Seafood’. New packaging emphasises a seaside feel with Beach Huts and other scenes from Whitby prominent on the packaging.

The company featured in a Channel 4 documentary, "Food Unwrapped", in June 2013.
