= Don't let Devon go to waste =

Recycling campaign in Devon, England

www.recycledevon.org

Don't let Devon go to waste is a recycling and waste-awareness campaign, based in the county of Devon. The campaign was created in 2002.

In order to encourage the public to Reduce, Reuse, Recycle and Compost across the county, Don't let Devon go to waste is jointly funded by all eleven local authorities, which form the Devon Authorities Recycling Partnership.

== Campaign Success ==
Numerous adverts have been produced for the campaign. In 2008, 'A Fistful of Rubbish', which was aired across the county's cinemas and local television stations, won the international Chip Shop Award; it was also used by Cumbria County Council in 2009. The advert was directed by Peter Richardson of 'The Comic Strip Presents' fame on behalf of the Exeter-based advertising agency, RH

Fistful of rubbish TV ad

Advertising and follows a spaghetti western storyline with a recycling standoff ending with two men stripping naked and pushing their clothes into the recycling bank. As they strip off an old lady passing by on her bicycle steers into a ditch. The strapline is "Recycling. Give it

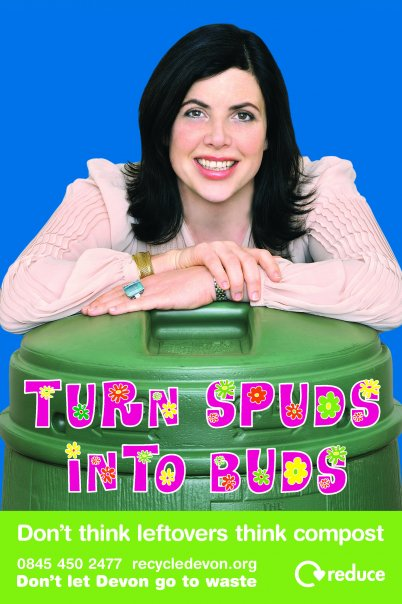
Kirstie Allsopp promoting composting, in 2009

all you've got."

Various celebrities, including Phillipa Forrester, Rik Mayall and the late Keith Floyd, have publicly supported the campaign, with both Mayall and Floyd appearing in television adverts. Most recent was the involvement of Location, Location, Location presenter Kirstie Allsopp, who became the face of the composting campaign in 2009.

== Love Food, Hate Waste ==
From 2008, Don't let Devon go to waste has been supporting the national Love Food Hate Waste campaign, which was launched by the Waste & Resources Action Programme, in order to tackle the £11 Billion worth of food thrown away in Britain each year.

== See also ==
Food waste in the United Kingdom
