= Cattle Health Initiative =

British Farm Health Planning project

The British Department for Environment, Food and Rural Affairs (DEFRA) has funded 27 Farm Health Planning projects, known as the Cattle Health Project. This included four bids from the National Animal Disease Information Service (NADIS). The purpose of these projects is to promote Farm Health Planning to the wider agricultural industry.

The Cattle Health Initiative project involves detailed health planning on 200 farms – 100 beef farms and 100 dairy farms.

Each veterinary practice involved in the process is required to select 10 farms (5 dairy and 5 beef) that are different in terms of type, location and management, to ensure significant diversity across the project.

== Other links ==
- Norfolk Farms Vets newsletter discussing participation
- Farming UK online journal – discusses results of testing
- Farmers Weekly Interactive online journal – discusses results of testing
- The Crofter, The Crofting Foundation, July 2004, Uist and Barra Cattle Health Initiative
