= State Veterinary Service =

British government agency

The State Veterinary Service (SVS) was, from 1938 to 2007, an executive agency of the Department for Environment, Food and Rural Affairs (Defra), a department of the Government of the United Kingdom. It was the government's delivery agent, responsible for animal health and welfare in England, Scotland and Wales.

The State Veterinary Department was set up in 1865 in response to an outbreak of rinderpest in London. The State Veterinary Service was established in 1938, and was overseen by the Chief Veterinary Officer. On 1 April 2007 State Veterinary Service joined with Egg Marketing Inspectorate, Dairy Hygiene Inspectorate and Wildlife Licensing and Registration Service to create a new enlarged agency called Animal Health.
