= Marine Management Organisation =

UK non-departmental public body

Marine Management Organisation (MMO)

Agency overview
- Formed: 1 April 2010
- Jurisdiction: England
- Headquarters: Newcastle upon Tyne, England
- Employees: 292 (2017)
- Agency executives: Les Philpott, chair of MMO board; Elysia McCaffrey, chief executive officer
- Parent agency: Department for Environment, Food and Rural Affairs
- Website: www.gov.uk/mmo

The Marine Management Organisation (MMO) is an executive non-departmental public body in the United Kingdom established under the Marine and Coastal Access Act 2009, with responsibility for English waters. The MMO exists to make a significant contribution to sustainable development in the marine area, and to promote the UK government's vision for clean, healthy, safe, productive and biologically diverse oceans and seas. The MMO aims to focus all of its activities and resources to meet its mission of enabling sustainable growth in the UK's marine area through 5 strategic outcomes:

1. Marine businesses support sustainable growth in the UK economy
2. The marine environment is protected for current and future generations
3. Coastal communities are thriving and engaged
4. Our decisions are trusted
5. Be a highly effective public body

== Roles and responsibilities ==
The MMO is independent of government as a non-departmental public body (NDPB). Its powers enable it to set up a marine planning system and a marine licensing regime, manage English fishing fleet capacity and English fisheries quotas, work with Natural England and the Joint Nature Conservation Committee (JNCC) to create and manage a network of marine protected areas (Marine Conservation Zones and European marine sites) designed to preserve vulnerable habitats and species in UK marine waters, respond to marine emergencies alongside other agencies, and develop an internationally recognised centre of excellence for marine information that supports its decision-making process.

The equivalent organisations elsewhere in the UK include the Scottish Marine Directorate and the Welsh Marine and Fisheries Division.

== History ==
The MMO was established on 1 April 2010 by the Marine and Coastal Access Act 2009. The MMO incorporated the work of the Marine and Fisheries Agency and acquired several important new roles, principally marine planning and other marine-related powers and specific functions previously associated with the Department of Energy and Climate Change and the Department for Transport, including harbour orders and works related to renewable energy installations.

== Activities ==
=== Marine planning ===
Marine planning is a new approach to the management of UK seas. The aim is to ensure a sustainable future for coastal and offshore waters through managing and balancing the many activities, resources and assets in our marine environment. There are 11 plan areas in England with the two areas in the North West merging to make a single area.

=== Marine licensing ===
A marine licence is required under the Marine and Coastal Access Act 2009 for many activities involving a deposit or removal of a substance or object below the mean high water springs mark or in any tidal river to the extent of the tidal influence. This could be constructing a port or wind farm, the dredging of a channel or laying pipelines on the seabed. There are many licensable activities as well as exemptions from requiring a marine licence.

The online marine licensing system has been running since 6 April 2011. The system aims to make applying for a marine licence clearer, simpler and providing quicker decision making.

=== Fisheries management ===
The MMO issues and administers vessel licences for English vessels. All commercial UK vessels need to be registered with the Registry of Shipping and Seamen, which is based in Cardiff and part of the Maritime and Coastguard Agency of the Department for Transport.

The MMO issues licence variations to reflect changes in licence conditions, quota limits and openings and closures of sea areas.

The MMO sets fishing quotas to help achieve the objectives of the Common Fisheries Policy for the conservation and sustainable management of fish stocks. The UK's quota is shared among 23 producer organisations (the sector), the inshore fleet (under 10 metre vessels) and vessels not in membership of a producer organisation (the non-sector). The MMO issues monthly catch limits for the under 10 metre and the non-sector and uses fishing vessel licence variations to open and close fisheries in specific sea areas.

=== Fisheries monitoring and enforcement ===
The MMO co-ordinates an enforcement programme for monitoring, control and surveillance of all sea fishing activity within British fishery limits around the coast of England, and English vessels operating outside those waters. This includes financial administrative penalties for fisheries offences, sea area closures, electronic recording systems, fisheries prosecutions, Registered Buyers and Sellers Scheme, satellite monitoring and illegal, unreported and unregulated fishing.

=== Protecting the environment ===
The MMO administers the approval of oil spill treatment products generally and in a marine pollution incident. The MMO also maintains a Marine Pollution Contingency Plan.

The MMO put in place management measures to prohibit or restrict certain activities in order to further the conservation objectives of European marine sites, such as a special area of conservation (SAC) and a special protection area (SPA), which are protected under the EC Habitats Directive and Birds Directive.

The MMO issues wildlife licences in the English marine environment or the Welsh offshore environment where the activity meets certain purposes and where there is no satisfactory alternative.

== Prosecution of Greenpeace for preventing bottom trawling in Marine Protected Areas ==
In 2020, protesters from the environmental group Greenpeace dropped boulders on the sea bed in the Dogger Bank marine protected area, an area used by bottom trawlers, and in 2021 the group dropped more in the Offshore Brighton Marine Protected Area. These rocks were harmless to surface fishing and marine life but prevented bottom trawlers which drag the on sea floor. The Marine Management Organisation prosecuted Greenpeace for these actions. The case was criticised by the presiding judge Edward Bindloss who stated "the MMO should support the prevention of any harmful deep sea fishing methods over important marine seabeds. It touches on the absurd that this litigation is happening at all.” In response The Maritime Management Organisation presented no evidence against Greenpeace and the case was dismissed.
