= Destin History & Fishing Museum =

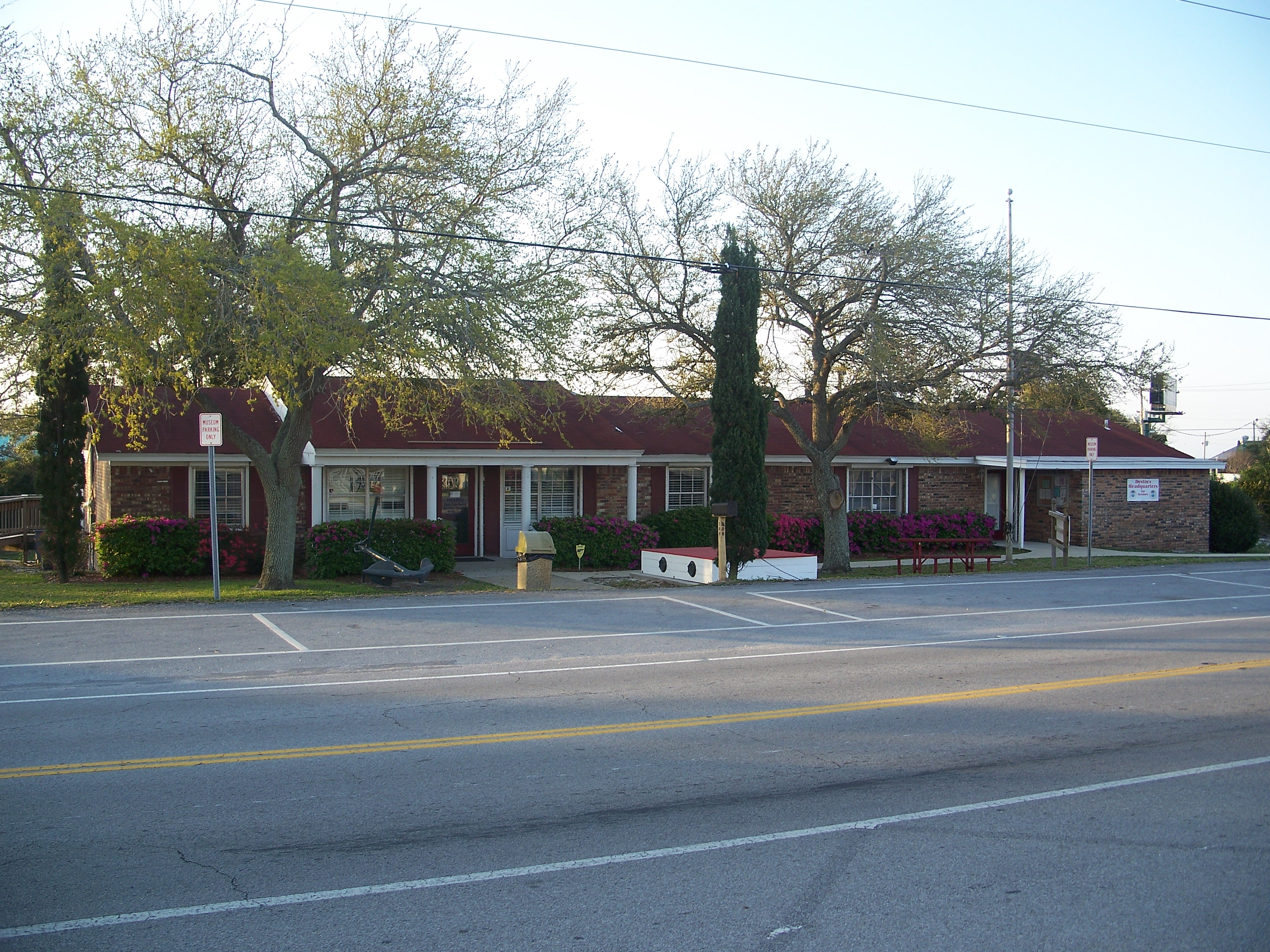

- Location within Florida
- Established: 2005
- Location: 108 Stahlman Avenue; Destin, Florida
- Coordinates: 30.39642°N 86.50903°W
- Type: History museum, maritime museum
- Website: Destin History & Fishing Museum

The Destin History & Fishing Museum is located at 108 Stahlman Avenue in Destin, Florida, at the foot of the Destin Bridge. It sits directly across the street from the Destin Community Center and down the road from the Destin Library. The house-like building is situated just off U.S. Highway 98, a busy commercial strip with many tourist attractions and amusements.

== History ==
This maritime museum was opened to the public on October 1, 2005, as a 501(c)(3) non-profit organization run by a board of directors. The museum building was originally home to the Destin Library before it moved to its new location on Silbert Avenue. As one of the few key historical repositories for the city of Destin, it is a popular destination for both residents and tourists alike. It contains exhibits depicting the history of the town and the fishing industry in relation to it. According to the museum’s official website, the exhibits “present the history of Destin and journey from a small fishing village to a major tourist attraction." Moreover, the exhibits include historic photographs, artifacts, fishing equipment, and documents of early Destin and the fishing industry. In addition, the original Destin Post Office Building is located nextdoor. The museum’s collection includes a mix of vintage photographs, antique fishing rods and reels, fish mounts and replicas, an original Pen Reel that belonged to Ernest Hemingway, and the oldest seine fishing boat still in existence, the Primrose. In terms of accreditation, the Destin History & Fishing Museum is not currently an accredited museum according to the American Alliance of Museums (AAM).

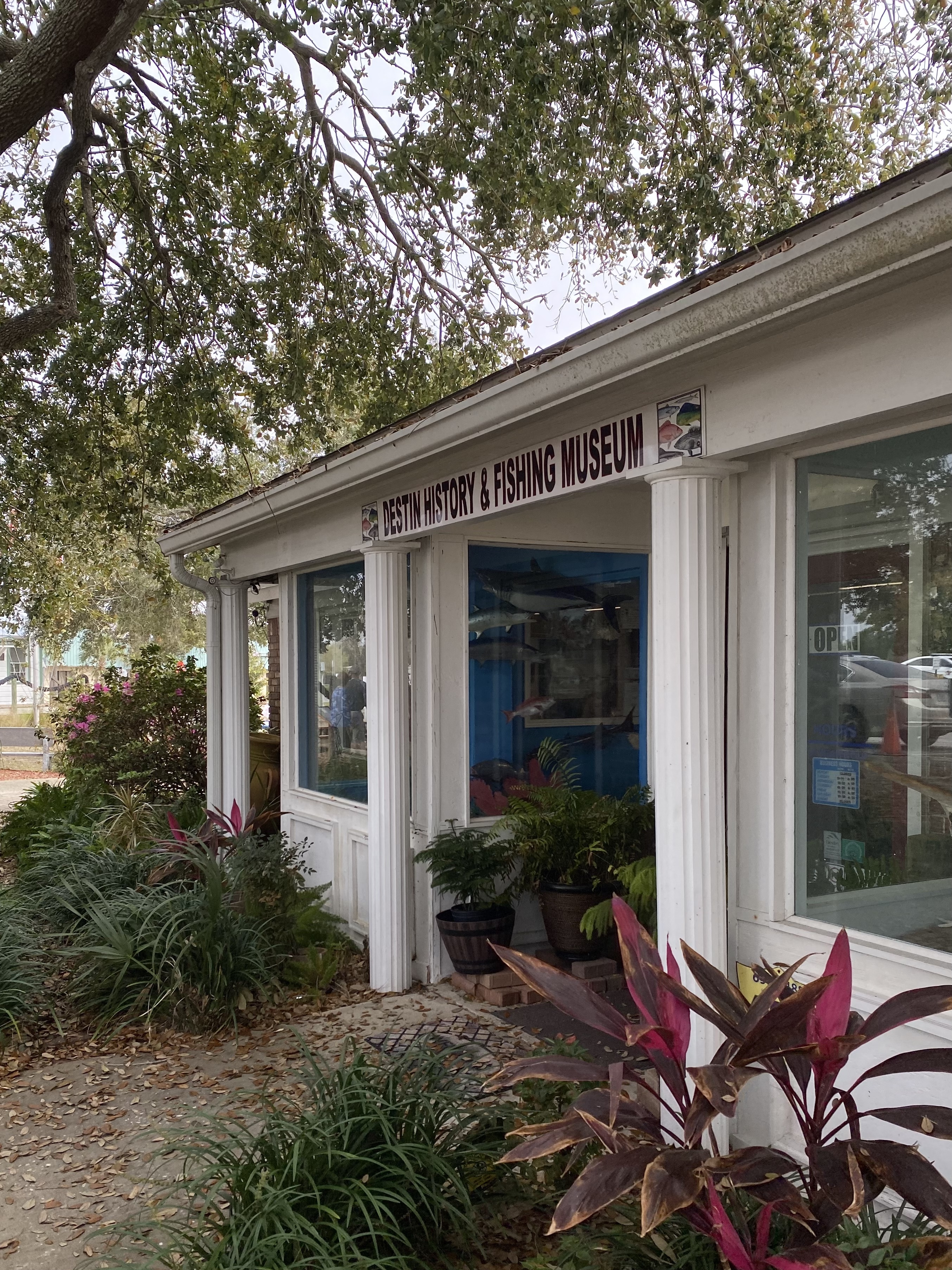
Destin History & Fishing Museum, 2022.

== Partnerships ==
The museum’s annual corporate sponsors include the following businesses/organizations: Okaloosa County, Okaloosa County Tourist Development Council, Ariel Seafoods Inc., Boshamps Seafood & Oyster House, Dewey Destin Seafood Restaurant, Harry T’s, Hilton Sandestin Beach Golf Resort & Spa, La Paz, Okaloosa County Charities Inc., Pump Out USA, Resort Quest, and SLS. In addition, the museum has individual partnerships centered around specific projects. The museum also regularly partners with the Destin Library and Destin Community Center for local events. There is a link on the official museum website that provides more information about corporate membership, forms, and fees. In addition, business members receive the following benefits for corporate memberships: an engraved company plaque, recognition in media, logo display, reduced admission prices, free use of the museum's meeting facility, a free corporate guided tour, and a tax-deductible contribution.
