= New Technologies Demonstrator Programme =

The New Technologies Demonstrator Programme is a scheme part of Defra's Waste Implementation Programme, New Technologies Workstream, to demonstrate advanced solid waste processing technologies in England. A pot of £30 million was allocated to fund 10 demonstrator projects, with the project being headed by Dave Brooks at Defra. The scheme is not on schedule for the ambitious targets that were initially set out by Defra; however, 9 projects out of the initial 10 are now projected to be operational by April 2009, over 2 years behind schedule.

== The scheme ==
The scheme initially was allocated £32 million, of which £2 million was to help fund research and development into waste technology. The scheme for the distribution of the main £30 million pot commenced in 2004 and was originally split into two rounds:

- ROUND 1: 5 demonstrator projects in operation by 31 December 2005
- ROUND 2: 5 demonstrator projects in operation by 31 December 2006

Their project had a huge response for the first round, with 71 pre-qualification questionnaire submissions being filed from interested parties. The quality of some of the initial bids were criticised by Martin Brockelhurst, Head of Waste Strategy, at the Environment Agency who remarked some of the applications were poor and came from a "young industry".

== Controversy ==
There have been concerns that the project is taking too long and some participants threatened to walk out. On 11 April 2006, Defra declared that its initial timescales were ambitious and projects were not on target. Of the 10 original projects planned a total of 9 have now been signed and includes gasification, in-vessel composting, anaerobic digestion and mechanical heat treatment. From the original target dates for operational demonstrator plants outlined in the initial assessment criteria only 2 projects are now operational (true as of 27 November 2006). On 24 November 2006, Dave Brooks announced that the new target for all plants being operational is April 2009.

== The projects ==
=== Operational ===
1. Greenfinch anaerobic digesters, Ludlow, Shropshire
2. Bioganix in-vessel composting plant, Leominster
3. Fairport Engineering, mechanical heat treatment, Merseyside
4. Energos gasification plant, Isle of Wight (currently under reconstruction until 2018)

=== Contracts signed ===
1. ADAS/Envar in-vessel composing plant, St Ives, Cambridgeshire
2. Premier Waste aerobic digestion plant, Durham

=== Abandoned or Cancelled ===
1. Novera gasification plant, Dagenham Novera withdrew from the DEFRA scheme in 2007.
2. Compact Power gasification plant, Avonmouth
3. Yorwaste gasification plant, Seamer Carr, Scarborough

== See also ==
- Isle of Wight gasification facility
