= National Waste Strategy =

The National Waste Strategy is a policy of the Parliament of the United Kingdom as well as the devolved administrations in Scotland, Wales and Northern Ireland. The development of national waste strategies is intended to foster a move to sustainability in waste management within the United Kingdom.

== Structure ==
The Environment Act 1995 added a requirement to the Environmental Protection Act 1990 requiring the Secretary of State, as of 2008 the Secretary of State for Environment, Food and Rural Affairs, to prepare a National Waste Strategy for England and Wales and the Scottish Environment Protection Agency, a Strategy for Scotland. The Strategy must include:

- A statement of policies for attaining the statutory objectives of the 1990 Act;
- Provisions relating to:
  - The type, quantity and origin of waste to be recovered or disposed of;
  - General technical requirements; and
  - Any special requirements for particular wastes.

The statutory objectives are:

- Ensuring that waste is recovered or disposed of without endangering human health and without using processes or methods which could harm the environment and, in particular, without:
  - Risk to water, air, soil, plants or animals;
  - Causing nuisance through noise or odours; or
  - Adversely affecting the countryside or places of special interest.
- Establishing an integrated and adequate network of waste disposal installations, taking account of the best available technology not involving excessive costs
- Ensuring that the network referred to above enables:
  - The European Community as a whole to become self-sufficient in waste disposal, and the Member States individually to move towards that aim, taking into account geographical circumstances or the need for specialised installations for certain types of waste; and
  - Waste to be disposed of in one of the nearest appropriate installations, by means of the most appropriate methods and technologies in order to ensure a high level of protection for the environment and public health.
- Encouraging the prevention or reduction of waste production and its harmfulness, in particular by:
  - The development of clean technologies more sparing in their use of natural resources;
  - The technical development and marketing of products designed so as to make no contribution or to make the smallest possible contribution, by the nature of their manufacture, use or final disposal, to increasing the amount or harmfulness of waste and pollution hazards; and
  - The development of appropriate techniques for the final disposal of dangerous substances contained in waste destined for recovery.

== England ==
=== Waste Strategy 2000 (WS2000) ===
The first version of the Strategy for England and Wales was published in May 2000. By 2007 Defra reported that:

- Recycling and composting of waste had nearly quadrupled since 1996-97, achieving 27% in 2005-06;
- The recycling of packaging waste had increased from 27% to 56% since 1998;
- Less waste is being landfilled, with a 9% fall between 2000–01 and 2004–05; and
- Waste growth was being reduced with local authority domestic and business waste collections growing much less quickly than the economy of the United Kingdom at 0.5% per year.

=== Waste Strategy for England 2007 (WS2007) ===
WS2000 was superseded by the Waste Strategy for England 2007 which was published in May 2007. The main proposals for England were to:

- Incentivise efforts to reduce, re-use, recycle waste and recover energy from waste;
- Reform regulation to drive the reduction of waste and diversion from landfill while reducing costs to compliant business and the regulatory agencies;
- Target action on materials, products and sectors with the greatest scope for improving environmental and economic outcomes;
- Stimulate investment in collection, recycling and recovery infrastructure, and markets for recovered materials that will maximise the value of materials and energy recovered; and
- Improve national, regional and local governance, with a clearer performance and institutional framework to deliver better coordinated action and services on the ground.

=== Waste Management Plan for England (2013) ===
WS2007 was superseded by the Waste Management Plan for England in December 2013. It did not introduce any new policies or change the landscape of how waste is managed in England. Its core aim was to bring current waste management policies under the umbrella of one national plan. It reports that (at the time of publication) "recycling and composting of household waste in England increased to 43% and business recycling rates have increased to 52%. Local authorities, who cover all household waste and some commercial and industrial waste, have reduced the amount of waste they send to landfill by about 60% since 2000."

== Wales ==
=== Wise About Waste: The National Waste Strategy for Wales (2002) ===
The Welsh Assembly Government published Wales' first national waste strategy in 2002, which replaced WS2000. The targets set in the strategy included those where Wales must meet targets set for the UK in EC Directives, primary Wales specific targets where the Assembly Government and its key partners (e.g. local government) had a direct influence over their outcome and secondary Wales specific targets where the Assembly Government’s influence is less.

=== Towards Zero Waste: One Wales. One Planet (2010) ===
Wales published its updated national waste strategy, Towards Zero Waste, in 2010. It sets out how the Welsh Assembly Government will build on the successes achieved through Wise About Waste, via a long term framework for resource efficiency and waste management between now and 2050.

== Scotland ==
=== National Waste Plan (2003) ===
Published in 2003, the National Waste Plan established the direction of the Scottish Executive’s policies for sustainable waste management to 2020. It had the following waste management objectives:

- provide widespread segregated kerbside waste collections across Scotland (to over 90% of households by 2020);
- aim to stop growth in the amount of municipal waste produced by 2010;
- achieve 25% recycling and composting of municipal waste by 2006, and 55% by 2020(35% recycling and 20% composting);
- recover energy from 14% of municipal waste;
- reduce landfilling of municipal waste from around 90% to 30%;
- provide widespread waste minimisation advice to businesses; and
- develop markets for recycled material to help recycling become viable and reduce costs.

=== Scotland's Zero Waste Plan (2010) ===
The Zero Waste Plan sets the strategic direction for waste policy for Scotland up to 2020. Its objectives include the following:

- Target of 70% recycling and maximum 5% to landfill by 2025 for all Scotland’s waste;
- Landfill bans for specific waste types;
- Source segregation and separate collection of specific waste types; and
- Restrictions on inputs to energy from waste facilities.

== Northern Ireland ==
=== Waste Management Strategy 2000 - 2006 ===
In March 2000 the Department of the Environment published the first waste management Strategy for Northern Ireland. This set out how waste generated should be managed based on the waste hierarchy.

=== Towards Resource Management: The Northern Ireland Waste Management Strategy 2006 - 2020 ===
In 2006, the Department of the Environment published Towards Resource Management, which focused on the period up to 2020. The strategy highlighted the need to increase waste recycling and recovery in a number of ways that included:

- the renewal of recycling targets;
- focused awareness campaigns; and
- the possible introduction of incentive schemes.

=== Delivering Resource Efficiency (2013) ===
The revised waste management strategy entitled Delivering Resource Efficiency was published in 2013. It retains and builds on the core principles of the previous strategy, Towards Resource Management.

== See also ==
- Waste in the United Kingdom
