= Brighton Fishing Museum =

Maritime museum in Brighton, England

Coordinates: 50.820381°N 0.144496°W

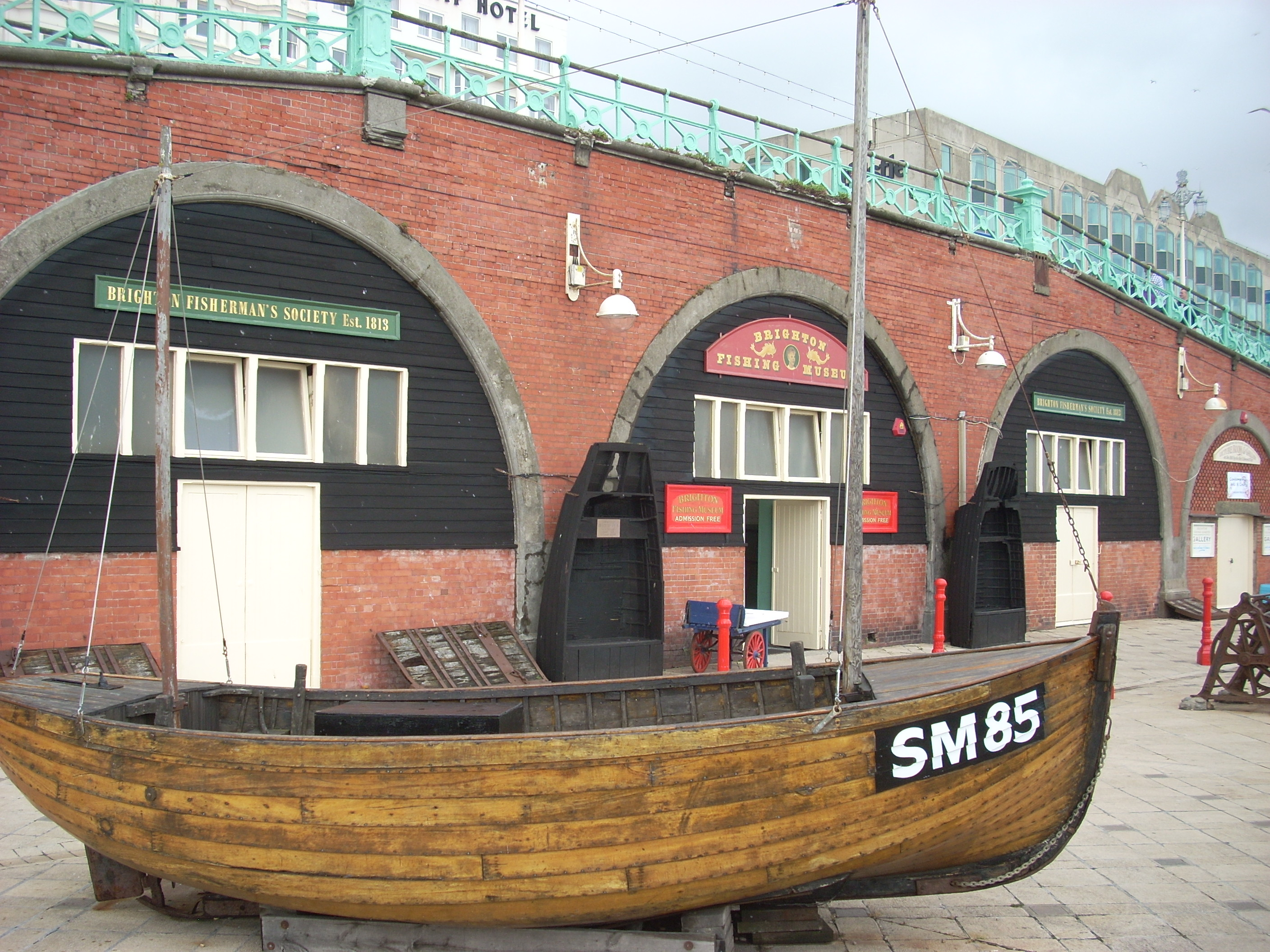

The Brighton Fishing Museum is a registered independent museum established in co-operation with the local fishing community in 1994. This museum is dedicated to Brighton's fishing and seaside history. It is located a short distance to the west of Brighton Pier within an area known as the Fishing Quarter, occupying two of the arches on the Kings' Road, which runs along Brighton's beachfront. Admission is free and donations appreciated.

The history, traditions and practices of the fishing community are shared by a mix of images, artifacts and fishing boats. Archive and contemporary film, a slide show and a tape of fishing families talking and singing depict Brighton and the sea fishing industry from the 1800s to the 1990s.

Historical and technical research underpins the renovation of vernacular Sussex beach boats and marine engines. Works are carried out on the hard in front of the museum's workshop and the restored fishing and pleasure boats are drawn up on the hard and beach. Model boats are also displayed inside the museum.

Tradition and free public entertainments are combined in the Annual Brighton Mackerel Fair organised by the museum and the fishing community, every May.

== Background ==
There has been a fishing industry on the Brighton beach for over one thousand years, the seafront arches in the fishing quarter have been in continuous use by the fishing community since they were built in the 1860s. In earlier times there were wooden netshops and rope houses on the beach below a natural cliff. Capstans were used to haul up boats that were then ranged along the beach in front of the arches and workshops. Nets were spread out to dry on the beach or upon the railings of the esplanade.

When Brighton became a fashionable seaside resort some of the fishing families adapted themselves to the leisure trade, operating bathing machines and pleasure boats for the visitors. The museum as an area devoted to two of Brighton's folk heroes: Martha Gunn the famous ‘Dipper,’ or bathing woman, and ‘Captain’ Fred Collins of the Skylark pleasure boat.

== Interior ==
The museum is filled with images of Brighton in the eighteenth and early nineteenth century when the fishing industry was based in both town and beach. Following conflicts with fashionable Brighton in the early nineteenth century the fishery was confined to the beach. The museum illustrates the evolution of the beach and arches and also the types of fishing boat worked off Brighton beach. A scale model of the classic Brighton hog-boat is displayed at the back of the museum. The 27 ft lugger Sussex Maid, inside the museum, represents a 1920s Brighton beach fishing boat with an auxiliary motor.

Towards the back of the arch are areas devoted to the history of Brighton's lifeboats, pleasure boats and fish market. The Brighton Fish Market was originally held on the beach but a new purpose-built fish market was provided in arches to the east of the museum in 1867. Fish were landed at Brighton by boats from all around the south east coast of England and also brought in by rail from as far afield as Cornwall. The fish market was closed in 1960 and Brighton fishermen now sell their catch at Shoreham-by-Sea.

At the front of the museum is an area devoted to the popular culture and dress of the fishing community. This highlights some traditional fishing and pleasure boat names and shows example of souvenirs - some brought home by fishermen, others made by fishermen for sale to holidaymakers. Images of costume illustrate both the variety of occupations and the social hierarchy of the beach. The danger of fishing, mortality and religion are an important theme: the museum arch was once base of St. Margaret's Mission and the Brighton Sailor and Fisherman's Home founded in 1860. On the outside wall of the arch is a memorial plaque to Sean Tierney, a Brighton fisherman lost at sea in 1994.

Inside the museum, by the bow of Sussex Maid is a display dedicated to the Brighton fishermen and boatmen who took part in the heroic evacuation of Dunkirk and St. Valery in the Second World War. Altogether 26 Brighton boats took part, two were sunk and two men were awarded medals for bravery.
