= NFDC =

NFDC may refer to:

- National Flight Data Center, a branch of the FAA that produces a complete navigation database for the United States of America.
- National Federation of Demolition Contractors, a UK trade association.
- National Film Development Corporation (disambiguation), various meanings:
  - National Film Development Corporation of India
  - National Film Development Corporation Malaysia
- New Freedom Data Center
