= Demolition =

Tearing down of buildings and other structures

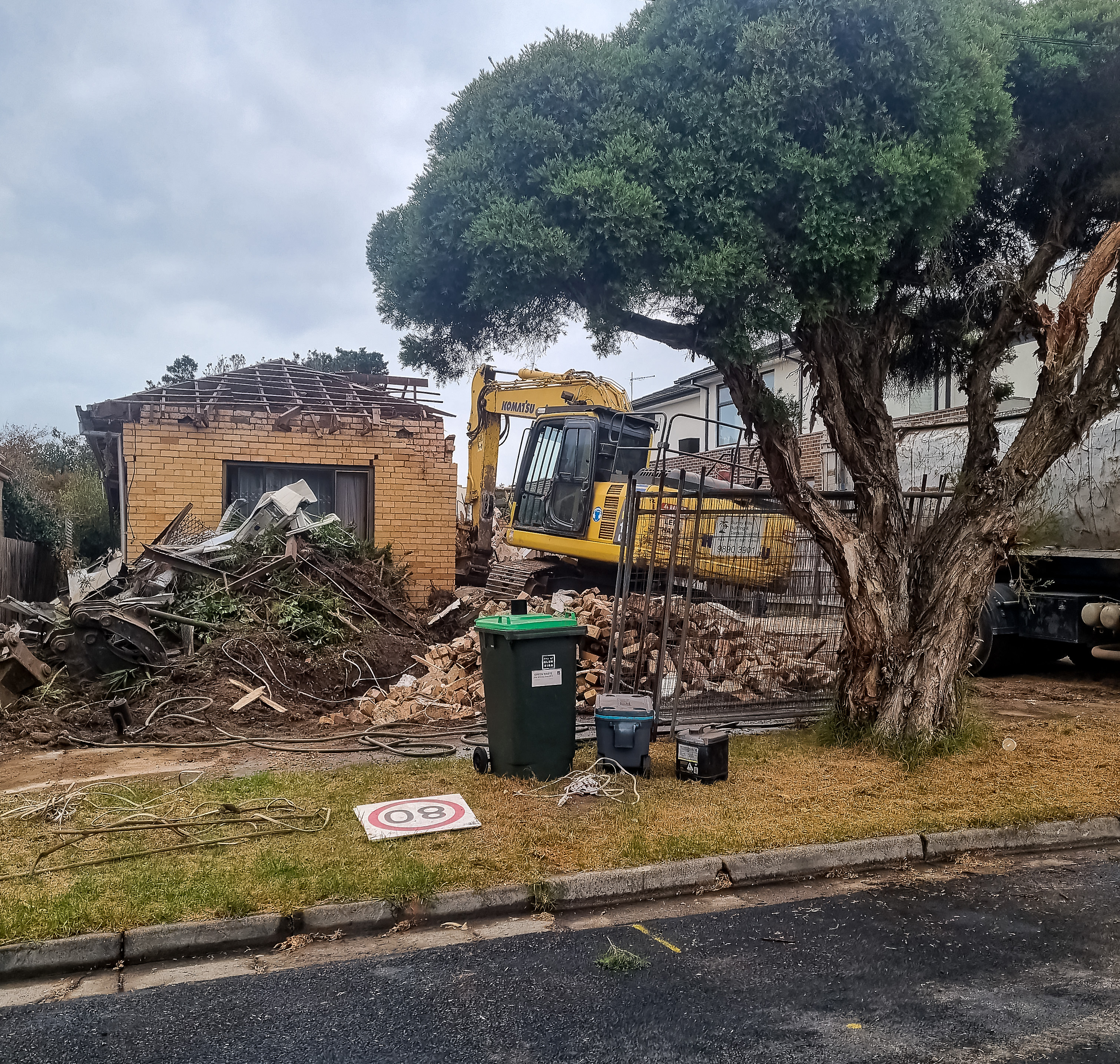
House demolition in Victoria, Australia

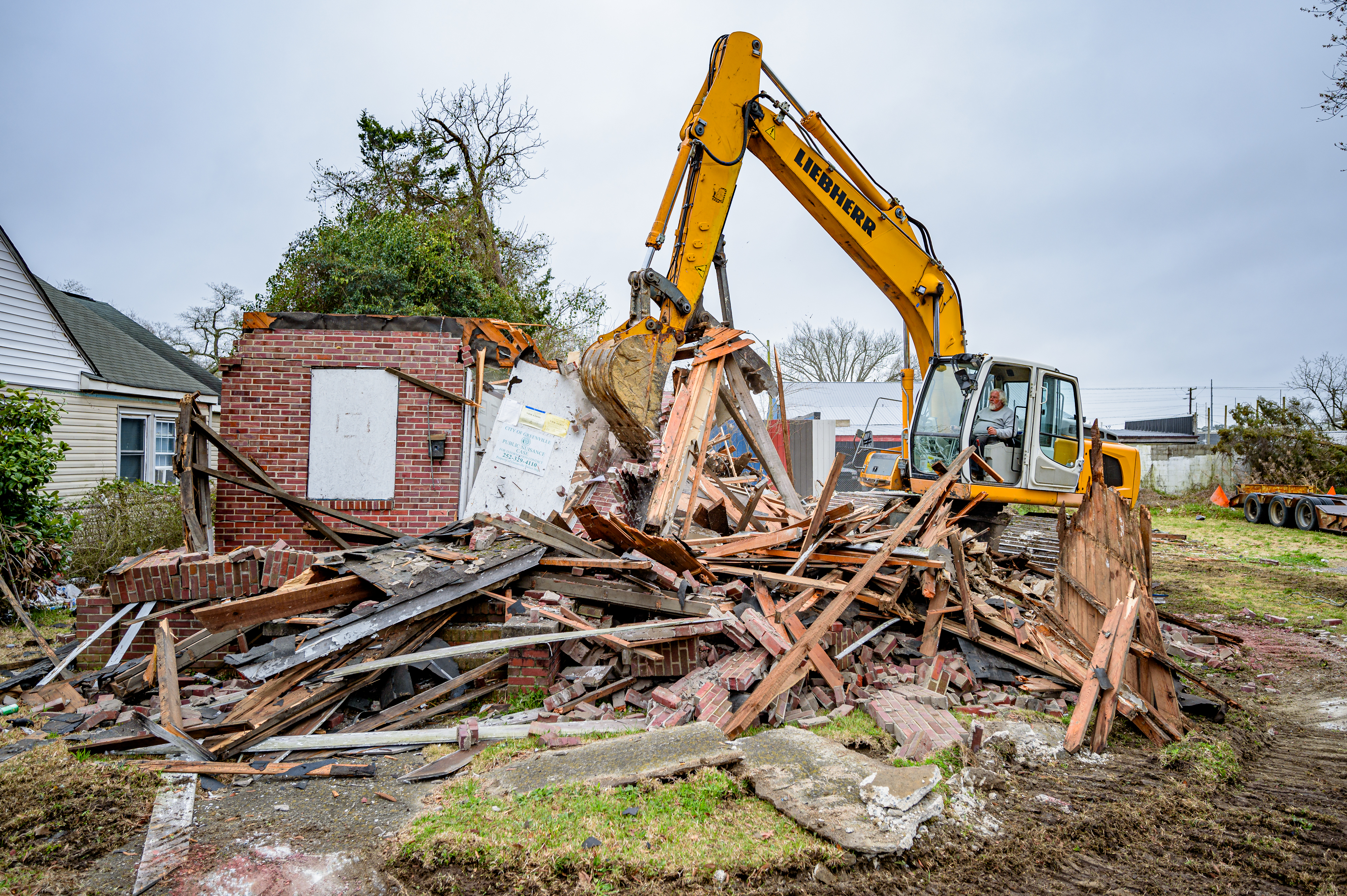
Demolition of a house in Greenville, North Carolina, USA

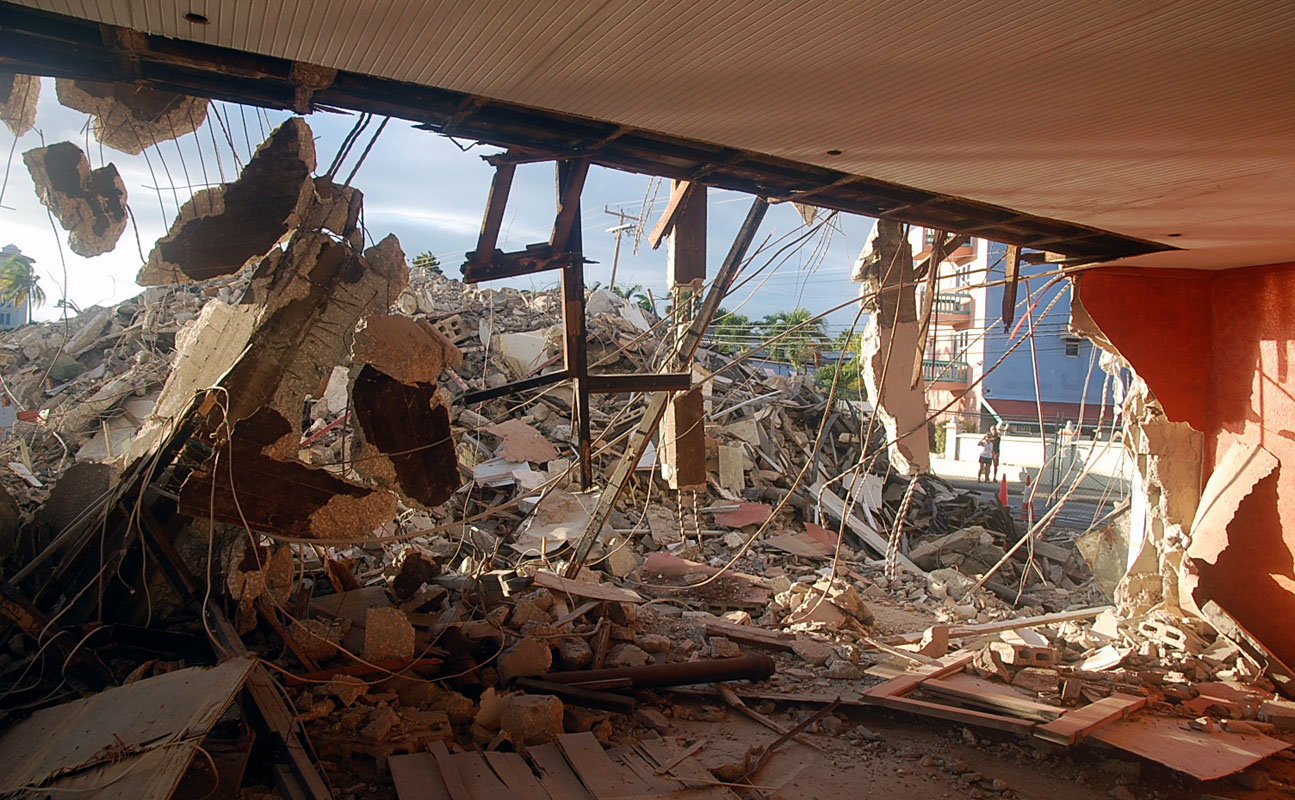
Demolition of Caribbee Hotel, South coast Barbados.

Remotely controlled demolition robot

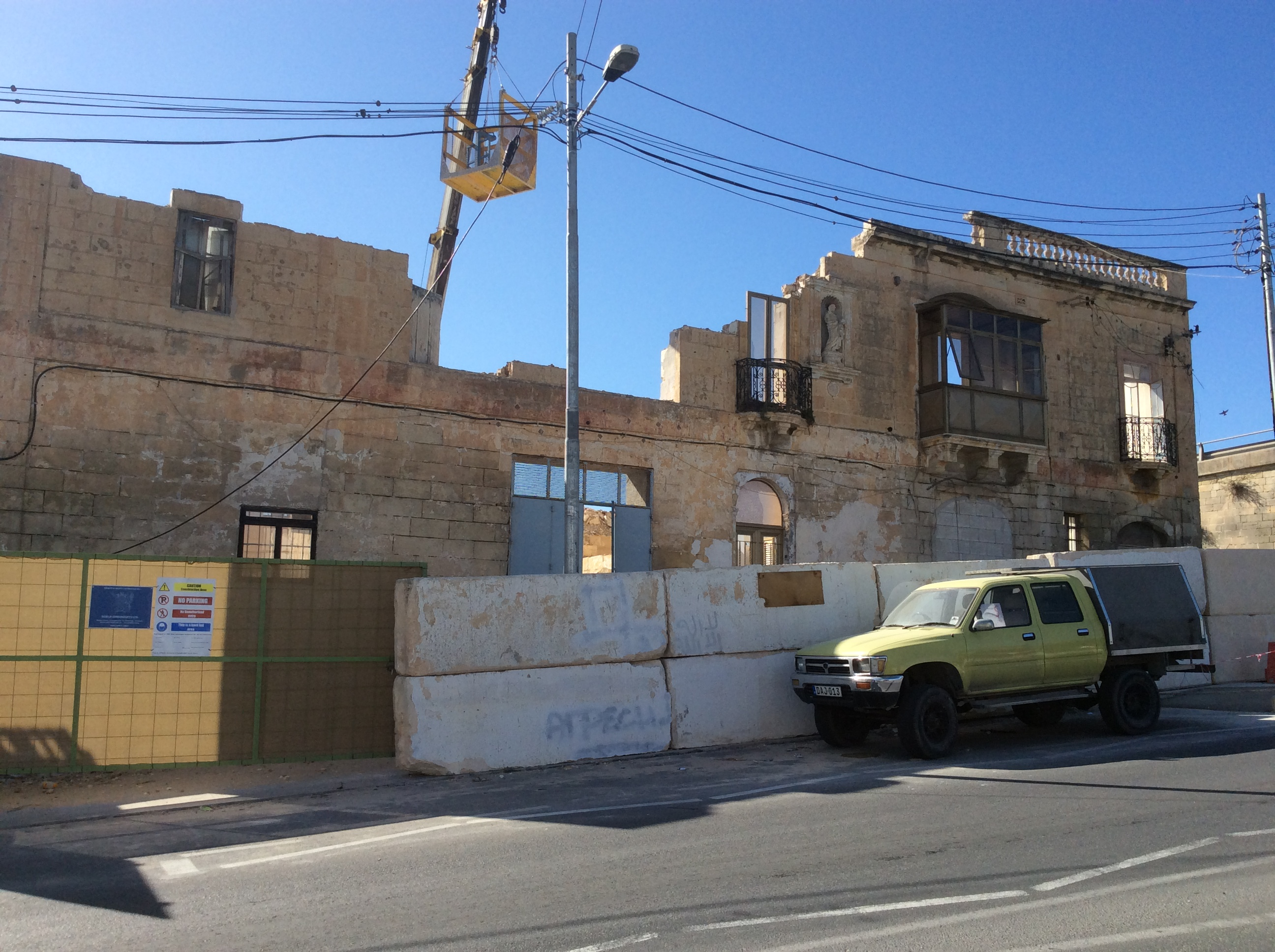
A partially demolished house in Qormi, Malta

Demolition of the cooling towers of the Athlone Power Station in Athlone, Cape Town, South Africa

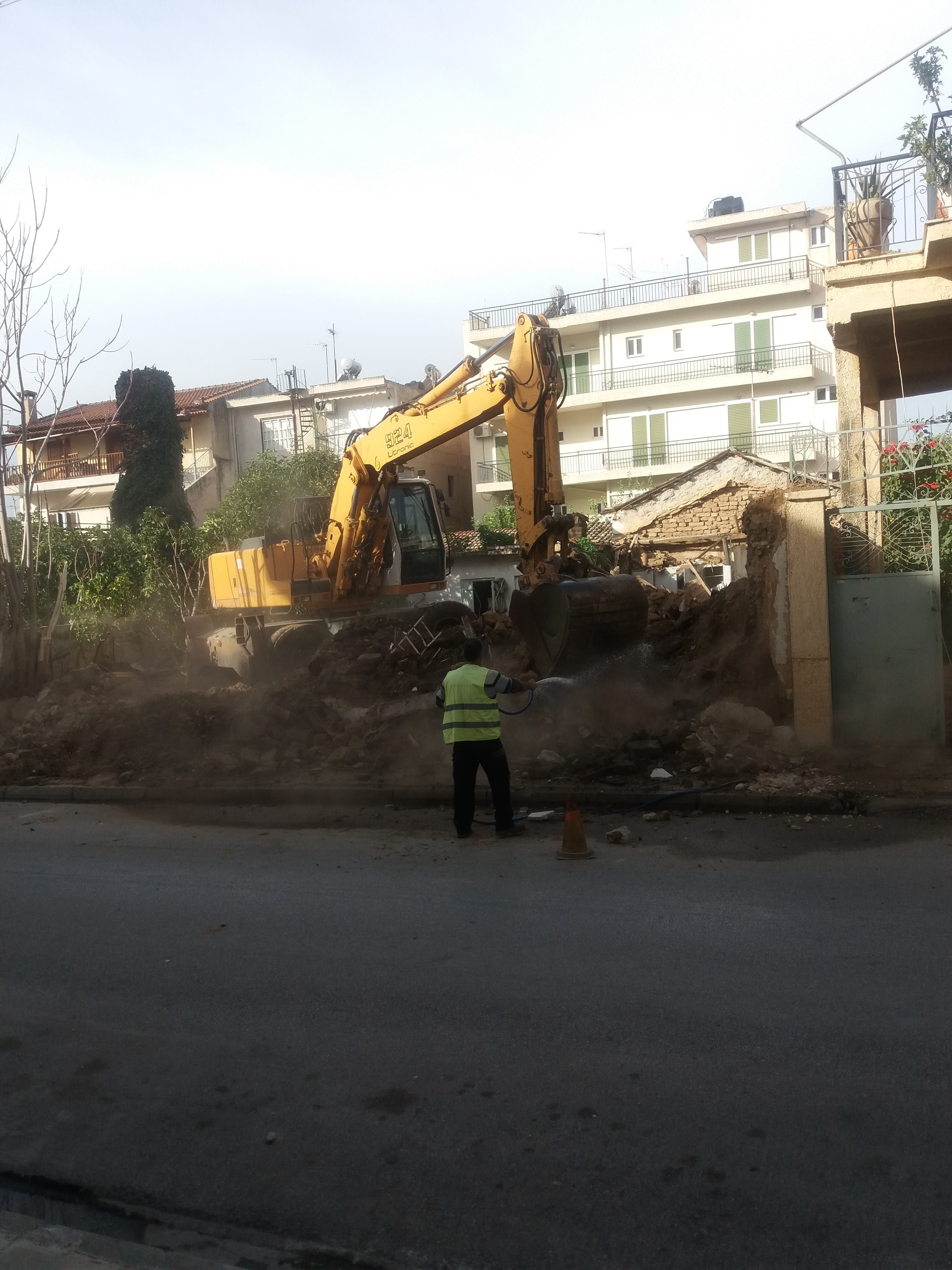
A house under demolition in Argos, Greece.

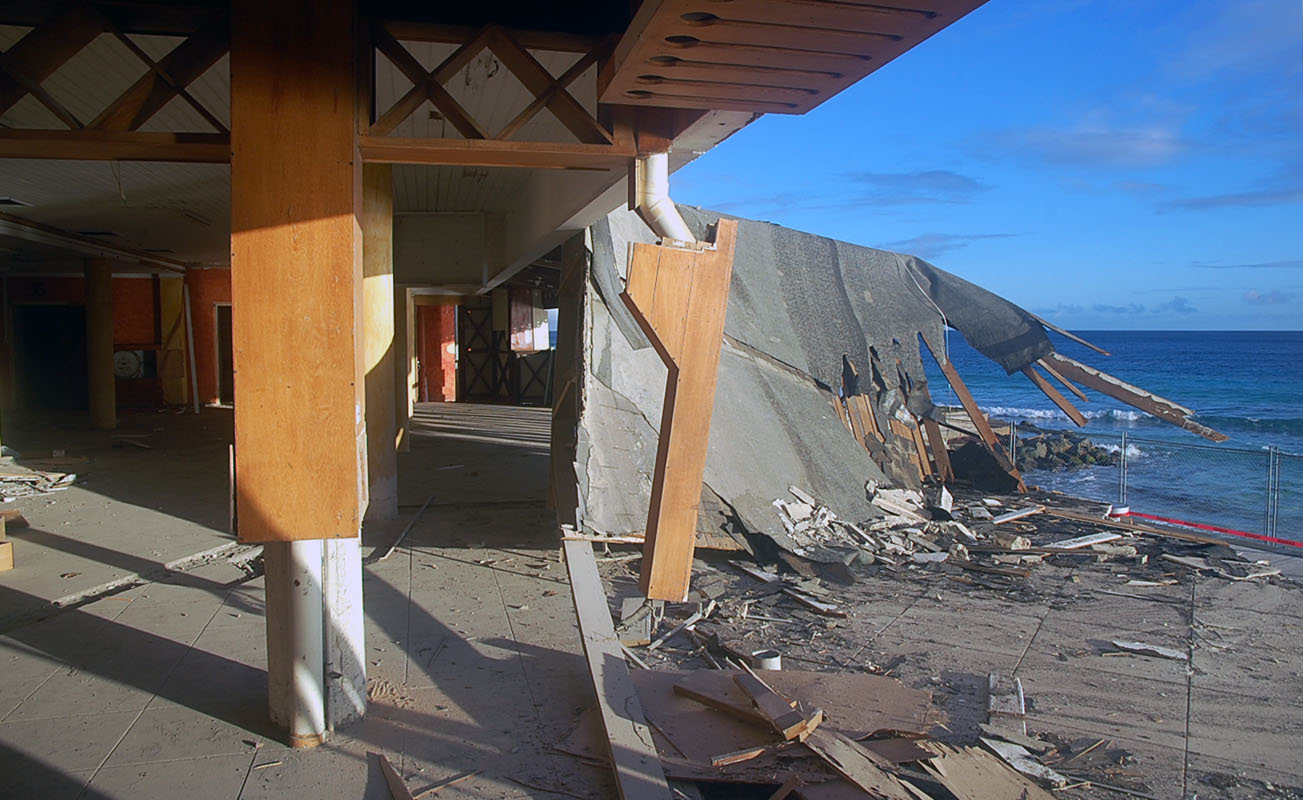
Demolition of Caribbee Hotel, South coast Barbados.

Demolition (also known as razing and wrecking) is the science and engineering in safely and efficiently tearing down buildings and other artificial structures. Demolition contrasts with deconstruction, which involves taking a building apart while carefully preserving valuable elements for reuse purposes.

For small buildings, such as houses, that are only two or three stories high, demolition is a rather simple process. The building is pulled down either manually or mechanically using large hydraulic equipment: elevated work platforms, cranes, excavators or bulldozers. Larger buildings may require the use of a wrecking ball, a heavy weight on a cable that is swung by a crane into the side of the buildings. Wrecking balls are especially effective against masonry, but are less easily controlled and often less efficient than other methods. Newer methods may use rotational hydraulic shears and silenced rockbreakers attached to excavators to cut or break through wood, steel, and concrete. The use of shears is especially common when flame cutting would be dangerous. The demolition robot was introduced in the 1970s by separating the driver from the remotely controlled mini-excavator.

Before the demolition of the AXA Tower, the tallest planned demolition of a building was the 52-storey 270 Park Avenue in New York City, which was built in 1960 and torn down in 2019–2021 to be replaced by 270 Park Avenue.

== Manual ==
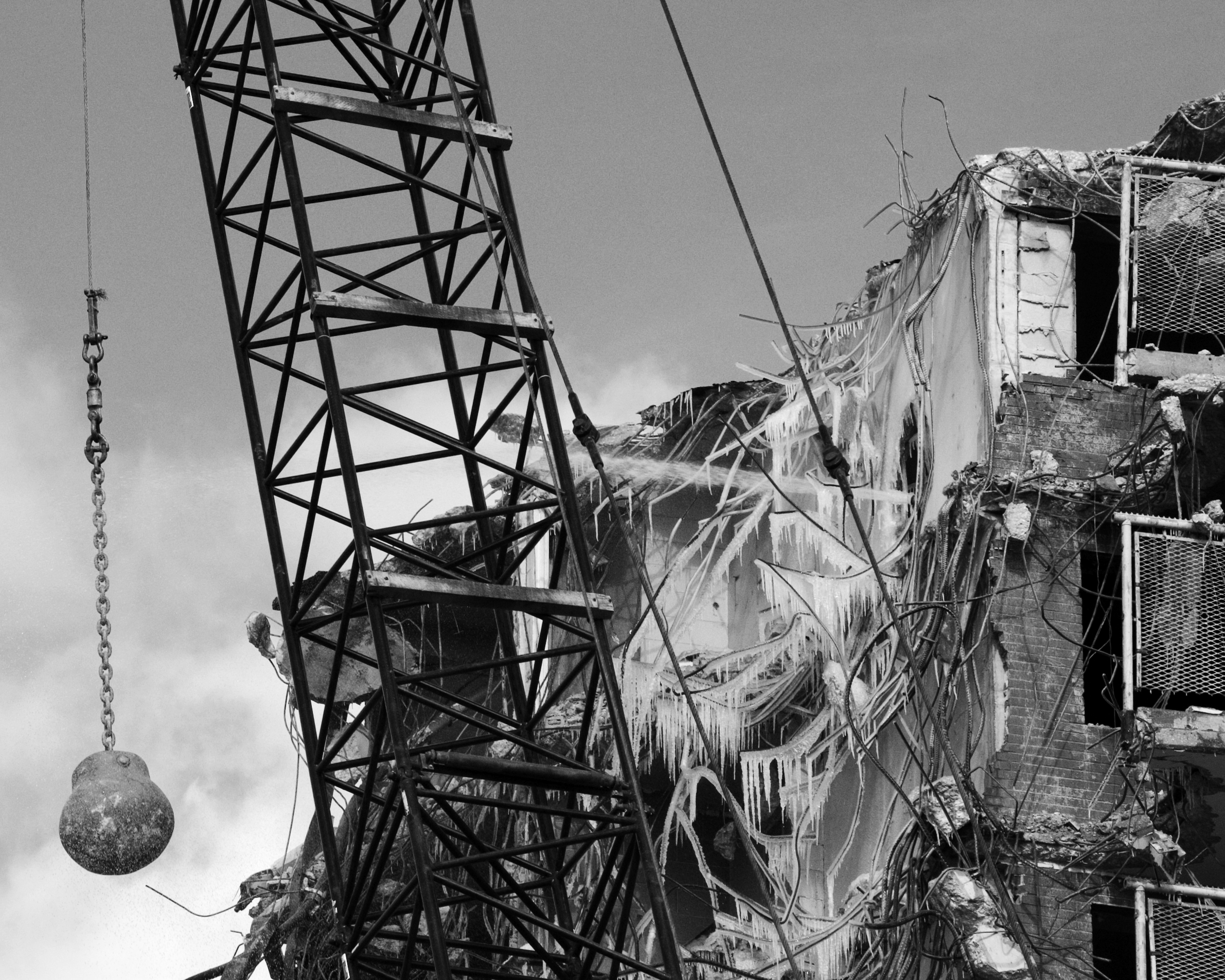
A wrecking ball in action at the demolition of the Rockwell Gardens.

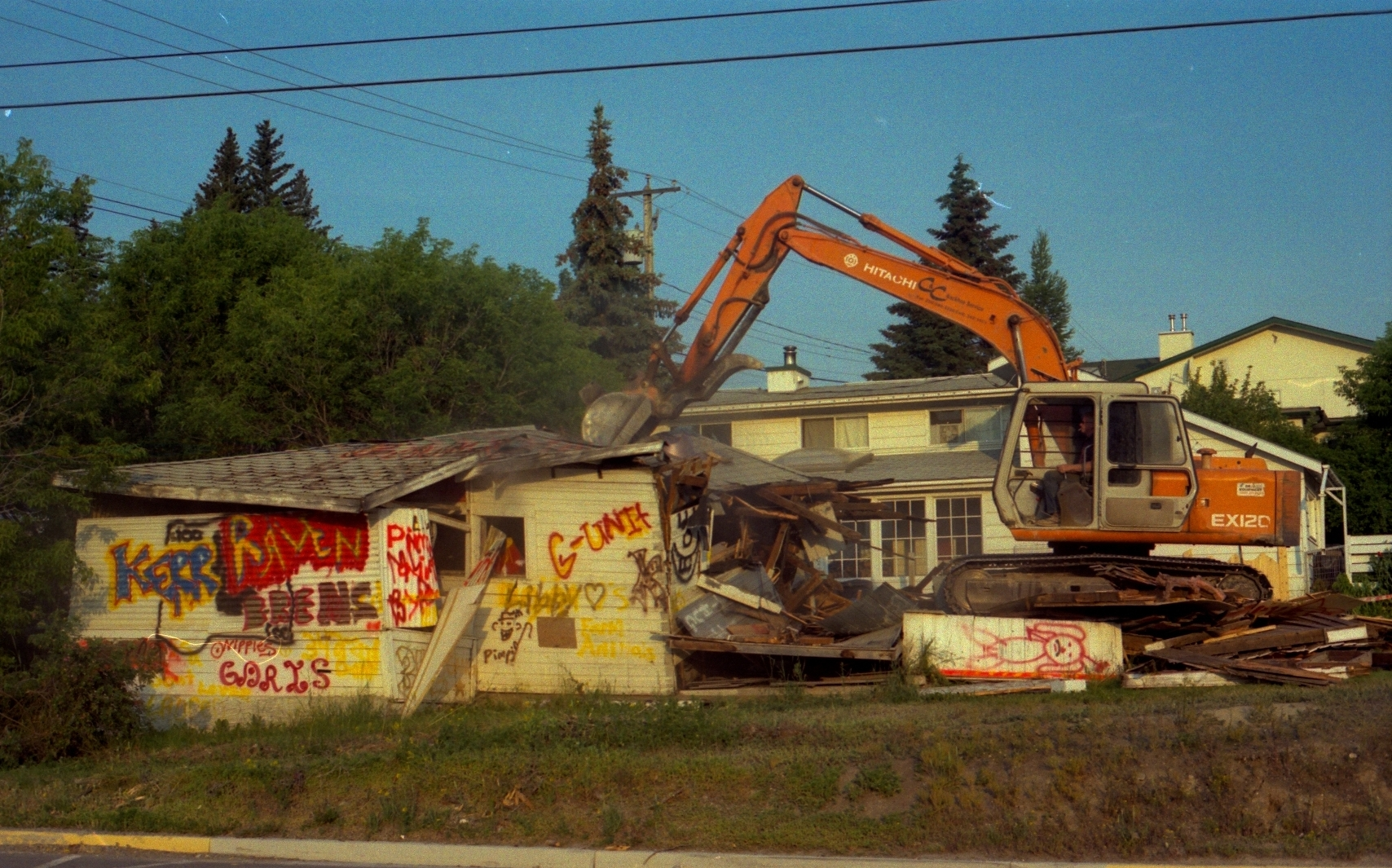
House destroyed by an excavator in Invermere, British Columbia.

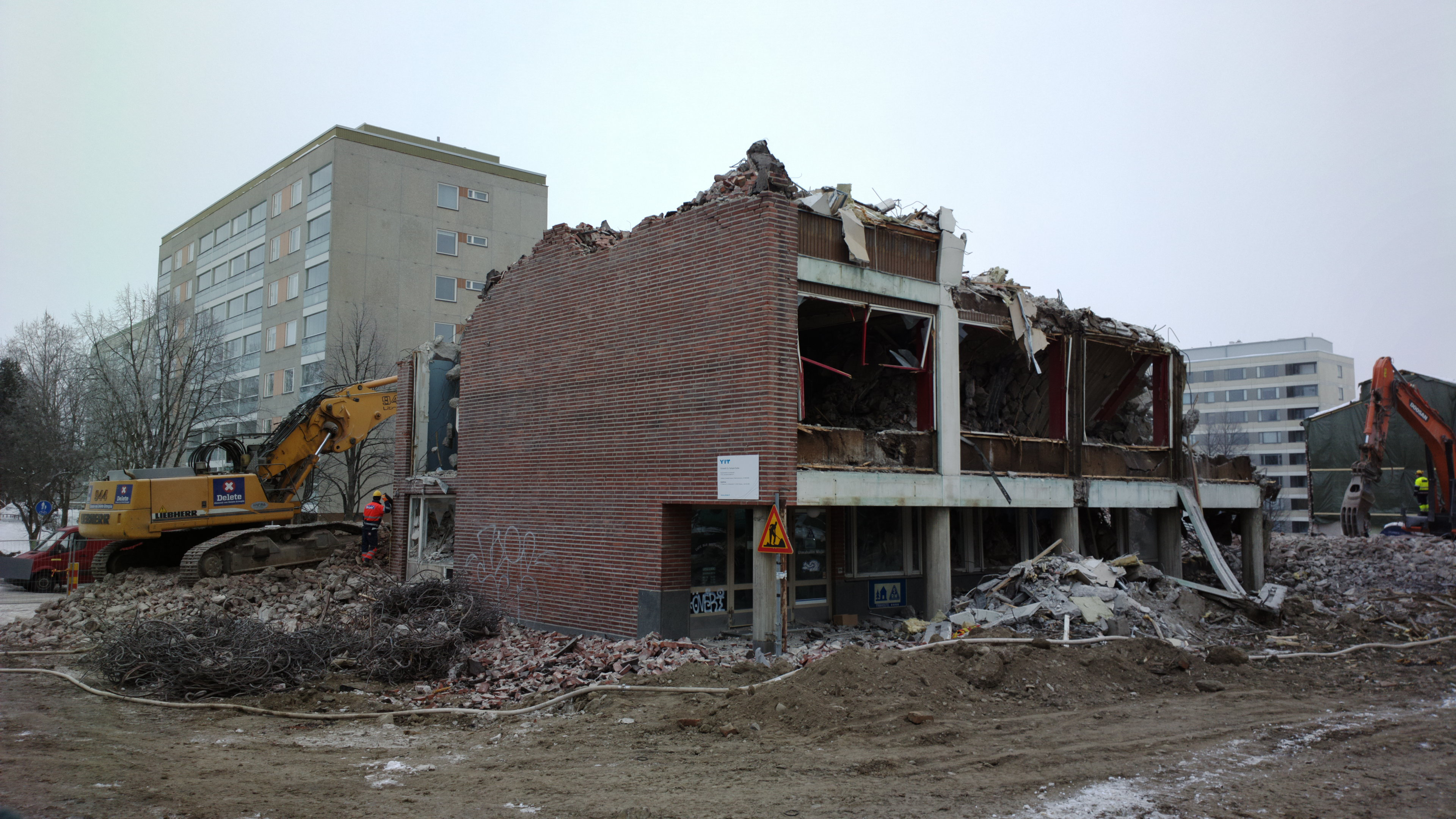
An old hostel building under demolition in Tampere, Finland.

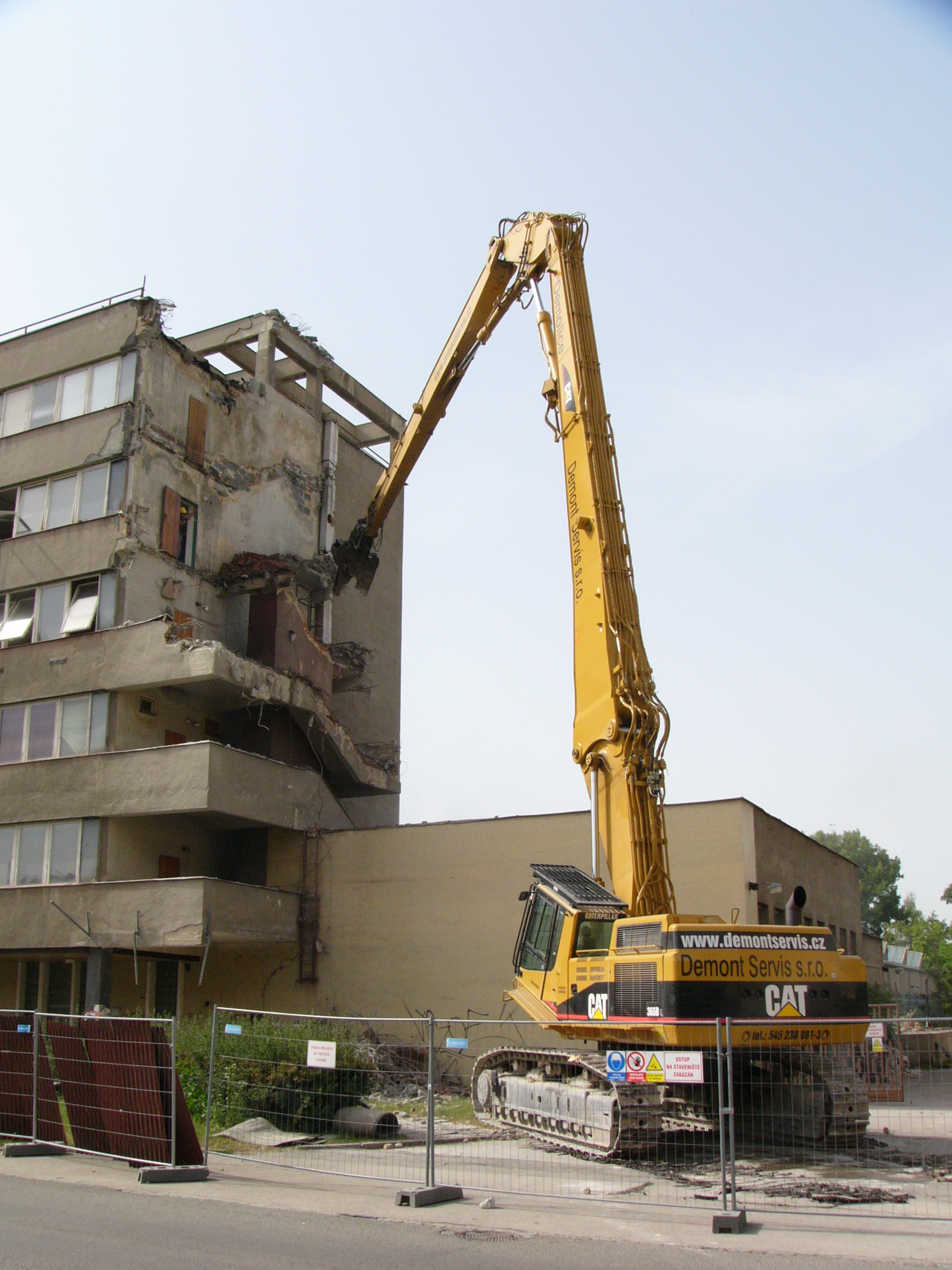
A high-reach excavator is used to demolish this tower block in the Czech Republic.

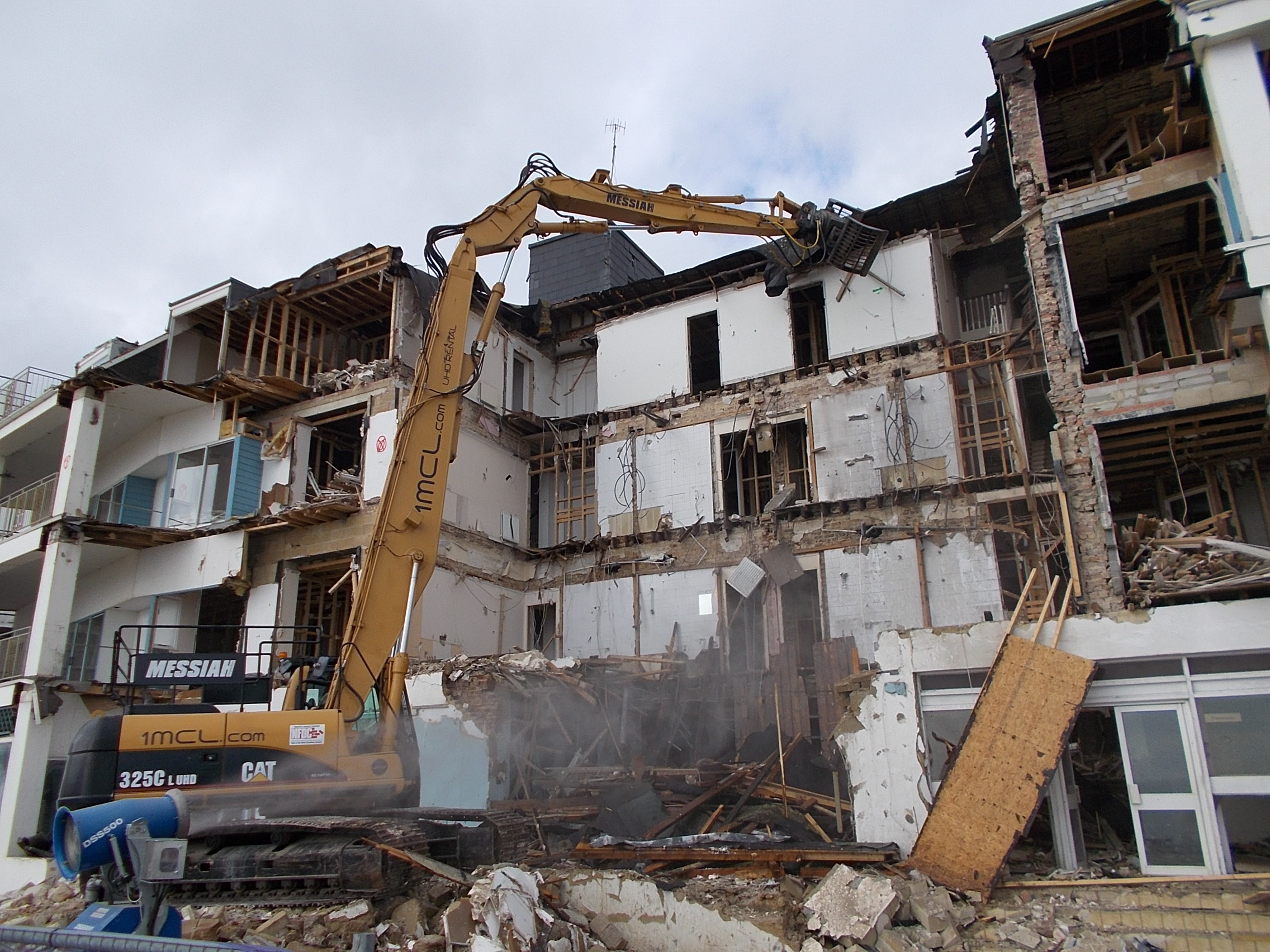
Demolition of a hotel in southern England.

Before any demolition activities can take place, there are many steps that must be carried out beforehand, including performing asbestos abatement, removing hazardous or regulated materials, obtaining necessary permits, submitting necessary notifications, disconnecting utilities, rodent baiting and the development of site-specific safety and work plans.

The typical razing of a building is accomplished as follows:

- Hydraulic excavators may be used to topple one- or two-story buildings by an undermining process. The strategy is to undermine the building while controlling the manner and direction in which it falls.
- The demolition project manager/supervisor will determine where undermining is necessary so that a building is pulled in the desired manner and direction.
- The walls are typically undermined at a building's base, but this is not always the case if the building design dictates otherwise. Safety and cleanup considerations are also taken into account in determining how the building is undermined and ultimately demolished.

In some cases a crane with a wrecking ball is used to demolish the structure down to a certain manageable height. At that point undermining takes place as described above. However, crane mounted demolition balls are rarely used within demolition due to the uncontrollable nature of the swinging ball and the safety implications associated.

High reach demolition excavators are more often used for tall buildings where explosive demolition is not appropriate or possible. Excavators with shear attachments are typically used to dismantle steel structural elements. Hydraulic hammers are often used for concrete structures and concrete processing attachments are used to crush concrete to a manageable size, and to remove reinforcing steel. For tall concrete buildings, where neither explosive nor high reach demolition with an excavator is safe or practical, the "inside-out" method is used, whereby remotely operated mini-excavators or demolition robot demolish the building from the inside, whilst maintaining the outer walls of the building as a scaffolding, as each floor is demolished.

To control dust, fire hoses are used to maintain a wet demolition. Hoses may be held by workers, secured in fixed location, or attached to lifts to gain elevation.

Loaders or bulldozers may also be used to demolish a building. They are typically equipped with "rakes" (thick pieces of steel that could be an I-beam or tube) that are used to ram building walls. Skid loaders and loaders will also be used to take materials out and sort steel.

The technique of Vérinage is used in France to weaken and buckle the supports of central floors promoting the collapse of the top part of a building onto the bottom resulting in a rapid, symmetrical, collapse.

The Japanese company Kajima Construction has developed a new method of demolishing buildings which involves using computer-controlled hydraulic jacks to support the bottom floor as the supporting columns are removed. The floor is lowered and this process is repeated for each floor. This technique is safer and more environmentally friendly, and is useful in areas of high population density.

To demolish bridges, hoe rams are typically used to remove the concrete road deck and piers, while hydraulic shears are used to remove the bridge's structural steel.

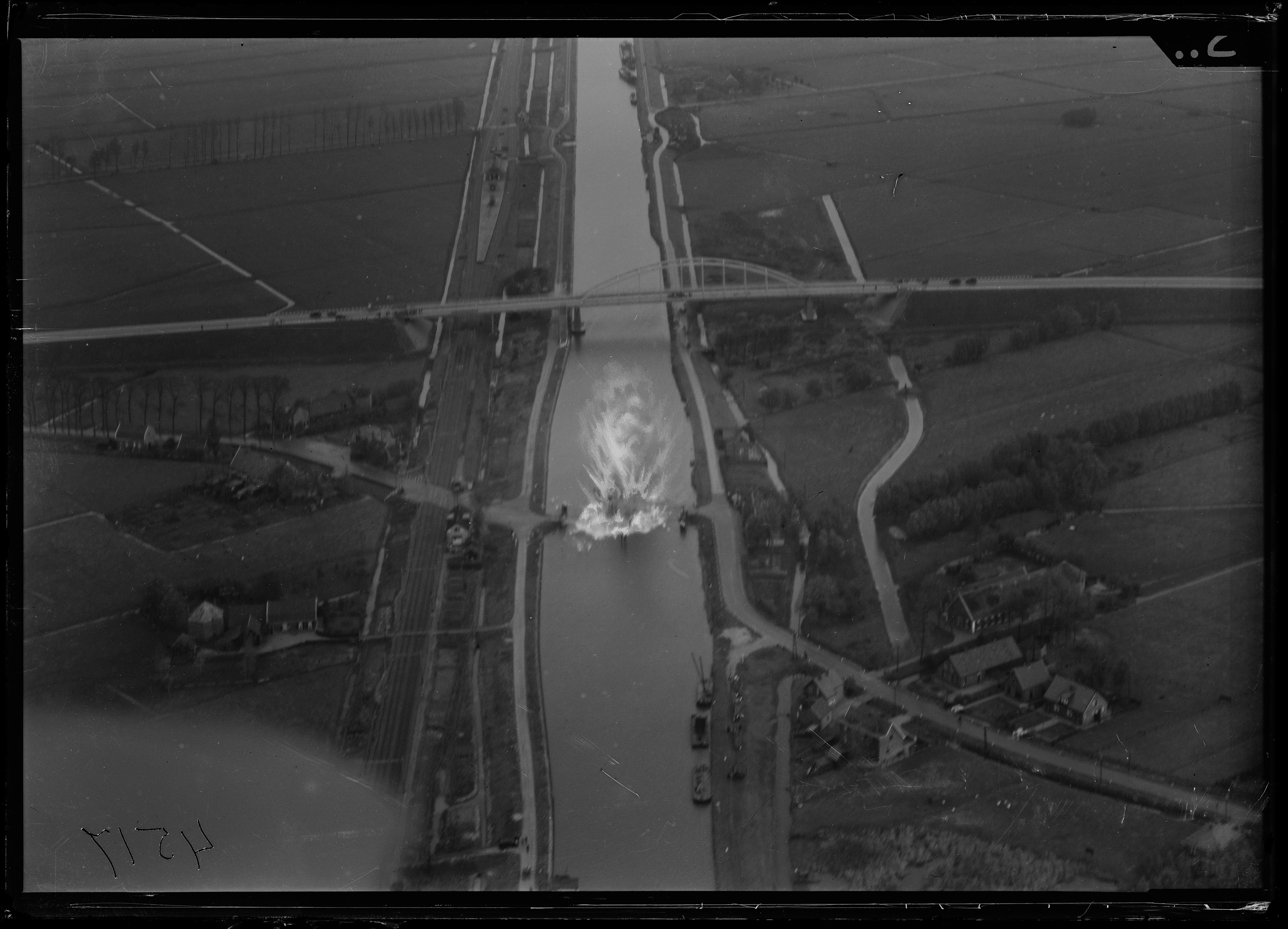
Bridge demolition using explosives near Nieuwersluis, The Netherlands, 1920-1940

Fred Dibnah used a manual method of demolition to remove industrial chimneys in Great Britain. He cut an ingress at the base of the chimney—supporting the brickwork with wooden props—and then burning away the props so that the chimney fell, using no explosives and usually hand-operated power tools.

== Building implosion ==
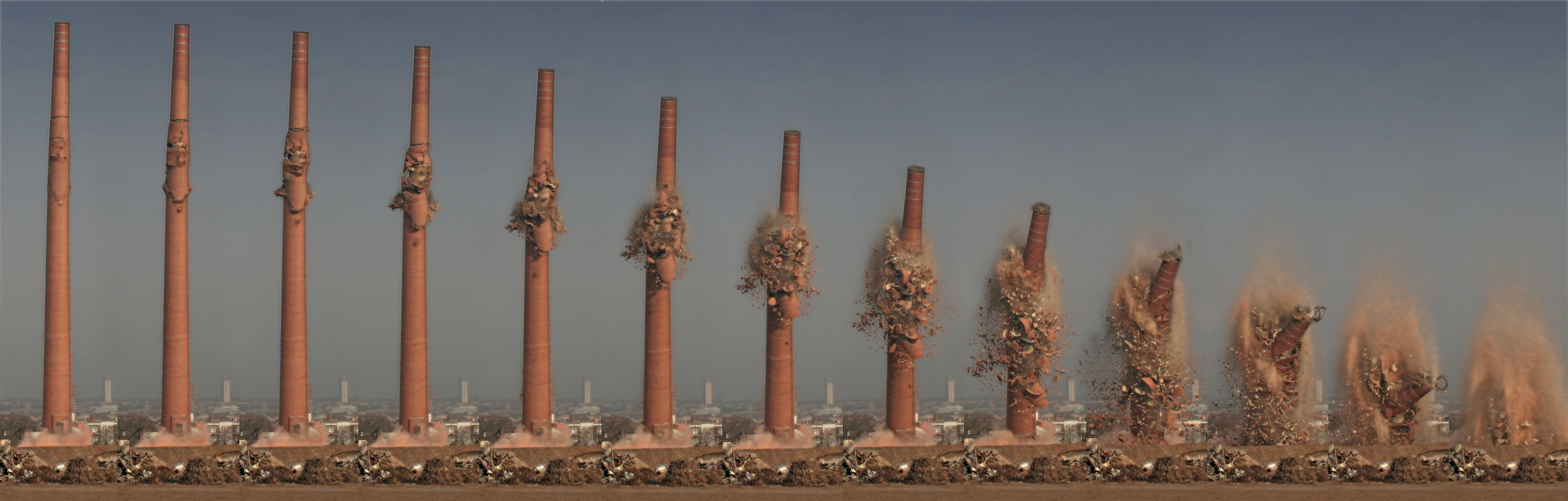
Demolition of a chimney at the former brewery "Henninger" in Frankfurt am Main, Germany, on 2 December 2006

The demolition of the New Haven Coliseum in New Haven, Connecticut

Large buildings, tall chimneys, smokestacks, bridges, and increasingly some smaller structures may be destroyed by building implosion using explosives. Imploding a structure is very fast—the collapse itself only takes seconds—and an expert can ensure that the structure falls into its own footprint, so as not to damage neighboring structures. This is essential for tall structures in dense urban areas.

Any error can be disastrous, however, and some demolitions have failed, severely damaging neighboring structures. One significant danger is from flying debris, which, when improperly prepared for, can kill onlookers.

Another dangerous scenario is the partial failure of an attempted implosion. When a building fails to collapse completely the structure may be unstable, tilting at a dangerous angle, and filled with un-detonated but still primed explosives, making it difficult for workers to approach safely.

A third danger comes from air overpressure that occurs during the implosion. If the sky is clear, the shock wave, a wave of energy and sound, travels upwards and disperses, but if cloud coverage is low, the shock wave can travel outwards, breaking windows or causing other damage to surrounding buildings.

Controlled implosion, being spectacular, is the method that the general public often thinks of when discussing demolition; however, it can be dangerous and is only used as a last resort when other methods are impractical or too costly. The destruction of large buildings has become increasingly common as the massive housing projects of the 1960s and 1970s are being leveled around the world. At 439 feet (134 m) and 2,200,000 square feet (200,000 m^{2}), the J. L. Hudson Department Store and Addition is the tallest steel framed building and largest single structure ever imploded.

=== Preparation ===
It takes several weeks or months to prepare a building for implosion. All items of value, such as copper wiring, are stripped from a building. Some materials must be removed, such as glass that can form deadly projectiles, and insulation that can scatter over a wide area. Non-load bearing partitions and drywall are removed. Selected columns on floors where explosives will be set are drilled and high explosives such as nitroglycerin, TNT, RDX, or C4 are placed in the holes. Smaller columns and walls are wrapped in detonating cord. The goal is to use as little explosive as possible so that the structure will fail in a progressive collapse, and therefore only a few floors are rigged with explosives, so that it is safer due to fewer explosives, and costs less. The areas with explosives are covered in thick geotextile fabric and fencing to absorb flying debris. Far more time-consuming than the demolition itself is the clean-up of the site, as the debris is loaded into trucks and hauled away.

== Deconstruction ==
An alternative approach to demolition is the deconstruction of a building with the goal of minimizing the amount of materials going to landfills. This "green" approach is applied by removing the materials by type material and segregating them for reuse or recycling. With proper planning this approach has resulted in landfill diversion rates that exceed 90% of an entire building and its contents in some cases. It also vastly reduces the CO_{2} emissions of the removing of a building in comparison to demolition.

The development of plant and equipment has allowed for the easier segregation of demolition waste types on site and the reuse within the construction of the replacement building. On site crushers allow the demolished concrete to be reused as type 1 crushed aggregate either as a piling mat for ground stabilization or as aggregate in the mixing of concrete.

Timber waste can be shredded using specialist timber shredders and composted, or used to form manufactured timber boards, such as MDF or chipboard.

Safety is paramount; a site safety officer is usually assigned to each project to enforce all safety rules and regulations.

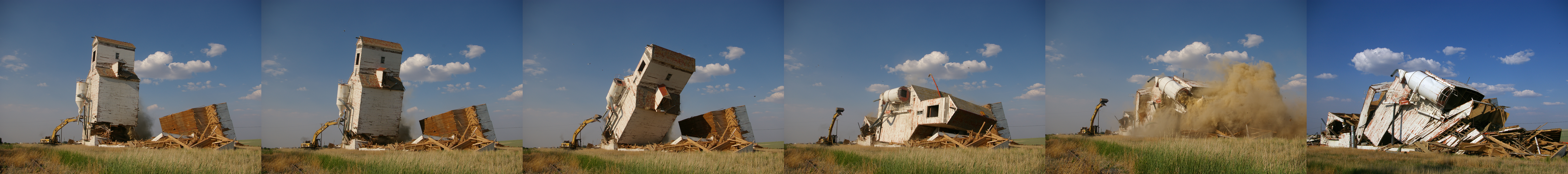
Demolition of the last grain elevator in Mendham, Saskatchewan, June 2009

== Teardowns ==
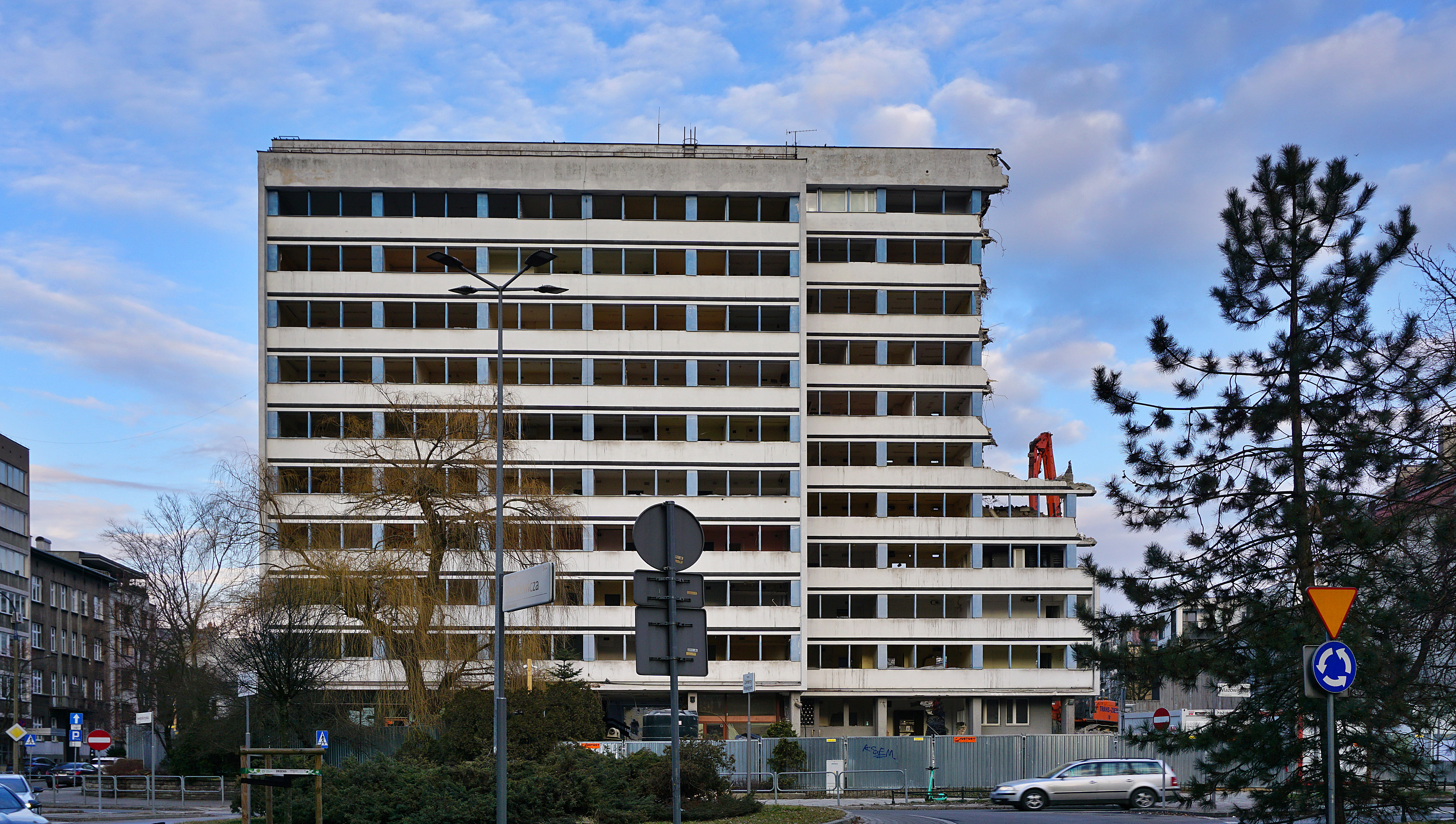
Demolition of the building in Kraków at 21 Mazowiecka Street

In real estate, a teardown or knockdown - also derisively called "bash and build" - is a term for demolishing a building immediately after purchasing it, freeing up the land for a new, typically larger building. The term first entered the real estate lexicon in the 1990s. A teardown is often done when the redevelopment value of a plot of land exceeds the value of the existing building. In the 2000s, teardowns by wealthy baby boomers replacing houses across America with outsized McMansions became so common that municipal building codes in many areas were revised, putting up more barriers to tearing down existing homes.

Teardowns are often cheaper than restoring an existing, dilapidated building. Sometimes, saving the older building can still be viable if the owner spends more money to restore it. Purposely ignoring issues with a building in order to force demolition for public safety reasons is known as "demolition by neglect". "Canyon effect" is a term used to describe when smaller houses are surrounded by new, multi-story buildings with blank walls.

== See also ==
- Construction waste – Unwanted material produced directly or incidentally by the construction industries
- Demolition waste – Waste debris from destruction of buildings, roads, bridges, or other structures
- House demolition (military) – Military tactic
- ICE demolition protocol
- List of demolished buildings and structures in London
- National Federation of Demolition Contractors – UK trade association (UK)
- Slighting – Damage of buildings to reduce their value
- Urban renewal – Land redevelopment in cities
