= National Film Development Corporation =

National Film Development Corporation may refer to:

- National Film Development Corporation of India (NFDC)
- National Film Development Corporation Malaysia (FINAS)
