= ICE demolition protocol =

For the Institution of Civil Engineers (ICE), the ICE Demolition Protocol is a British waste management protocol produced by EnviroCentre, in partnership with London Remade. It came out of a joint ICE and Institute of Waste Management group called the Resource Sustainability Initiative.

The first edition was founded in 2003 and the second in 2008, although the second version does not supersede the second.
