= National Federation of Demolition Contractors =

UK trade association

- Abbreviation: NFDC
- Formation: 1946
- Type: Trade association
- Purpose: Supporting and representing UK demolition companies
- Location: Hemel Hempstead, Hertfordshire
- Region served: UK
- Chief Executive Officer: Duncan Rudall
- Staff: 10
- Website: NFDC

The National Federation of Demolition Contractors Ltd is a UK trade association representing businesses involved in demolition work, and is headquartered in Hemel Hempstead, Hertfordshire. It describes itself as the Voice of the Global Demolition Industry.

== History ==
It arose from an informal group of demolition contractors assembled during World War II to deal with damaged buildings during The Blitz, then, in 1946, was incorporated as The National Federation of Demolition Contractors Ltd.

In June 2022, a Competition and Markets Authority investigation revealed ten demolition contractors (including Erith, John F Hunt, Keltbray, McGee, Scudder and Squibb) had engaged in illegal rigging of 19 bids worth more than £150m over a five-and-a-half-year period. The NFDC said: "We have a clear code of conduct, which all members sign up to, that is designed to ensure the highest standards of industry practice," but in July 2022, the NFDC announced plans to restore trust, requiring members to sign regular anti-collusion declarations. In July 2023, the ten firms were fined a total of £59.3m for their involvement in "illegal cartel agreements". Keltbray appealed unsuccessfully against its penalty and was fined £18 million.
