= History of human rights =

While belief in the sanctity of human life has ancient precedents in many religions of the world, the foundations of modern human rights began during the era of renaissance humanism in the early modern period. The European wars of religion and the civil wars of seventeenth-century Kingdom of England gave rise to the philosophy of liberalism and belief in natural rights became a central concern of European intellectual culture during the eighteenth-century Age of Enlightenment. Ideas of natural rights, which had a basis in natural law, lay at the core of the American and French Revolutions which occurred toward the end of that century, but the idea of human rights came about later. Democratic evolution through the nineteenth century paved the way for the advent of universal suffrage in the twentieth century. Two world wars led to the creation of the Universal Declaration of Human Rights.

The post-war era saw movements arising from specific groups experiencing a shortfall in their rights, such as feminism and the civil rights of African Americans. The human rights movements of members of the Soviet bloc emerged in the 1970s along with workers' rights movements in the West. The movements quickly jelled as social activism and political rhetoric in many nations put human rights high on the world agenda. By the 21st century, historian Samuel Moyn has argued, the human rights movement expanded beyond its original anti-totalitarianism to include numerous causes involving humanitarianism and social and economic development in the Developing World.

The history of human rights has been complex. Many established rights for instance would be replaced by other systems which deviate from their original western design. Stable institutions may be uprooted such as in cases of conflict such as war and terrorism or a change in culture.

== Ancient and pre-modern eras ==
Some notions of righteousness present in ancient law and religion are sometimes retrospectively included under the term "human rights". While Enlightenment philosophers suggest a secular social contract between the rulers and the ruled, ancient traditions derived similar conclusions from notions of divine law, and, in Hellenistic philosophy, natural law. Samuel Moyn suggests that the concept of human rights is intertwined with the modern sense of citizenship, which did not emerge until the past few hundred years. Nonetheless, relevant examples exist in the Ancient and pre-modern eras, although Ancient peoples did not have the same modern-day conception of universal human rights.

=== Ancient West Asia ===
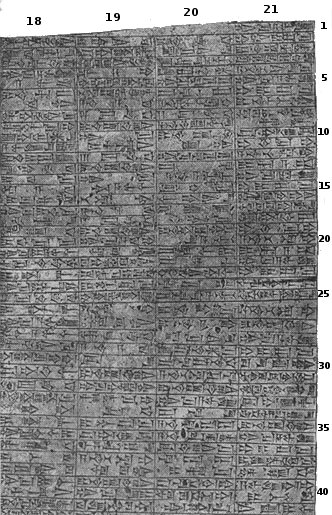
An inscription of the Code of Hammurabi

The reforms of Urukagina of Lagash, the earliest known legal code (c. 2350 BC), is often thought to be an early example of reform. Professor Norman Yoffee wrote that after Igor M. Diakonoff "most interpreters consider that Urukagina, himself not of the ruling dynasty at Lagash, was no reformer at all. Indeed, by attempting to curb the encroachment of a secular authority at the expense of temple prerogatives, he was, if a modern term must be applied, a reactionary." Author Marilyn French wrote that the discovery of penalties for adultery for women but not for men represents "the first written evidence of the degradation of women". The oldest legal code extant today is the Neo-Sumerian Code of Ur-Nammu (c. 2050 BC). Several other sets of laws were also issued in Mesopotamia, including the Code of Hammurabi (c. 1780 BC), one of the most famous examples of this type of document. It shows rules, and punishments if those rules are broken, on a variety of matters, including women's rights, men's rights, children's rights and slave rights.

=== Africa ===
The Northeast African civilization of Ancient Egypt supported basic human rights. For example, Pharaoh Bocchoris (725–720 BC) promoted individual rights, suppressed imprisonment for debt, and reformed laws relating to the transferral of property.

=== Antiquity ===
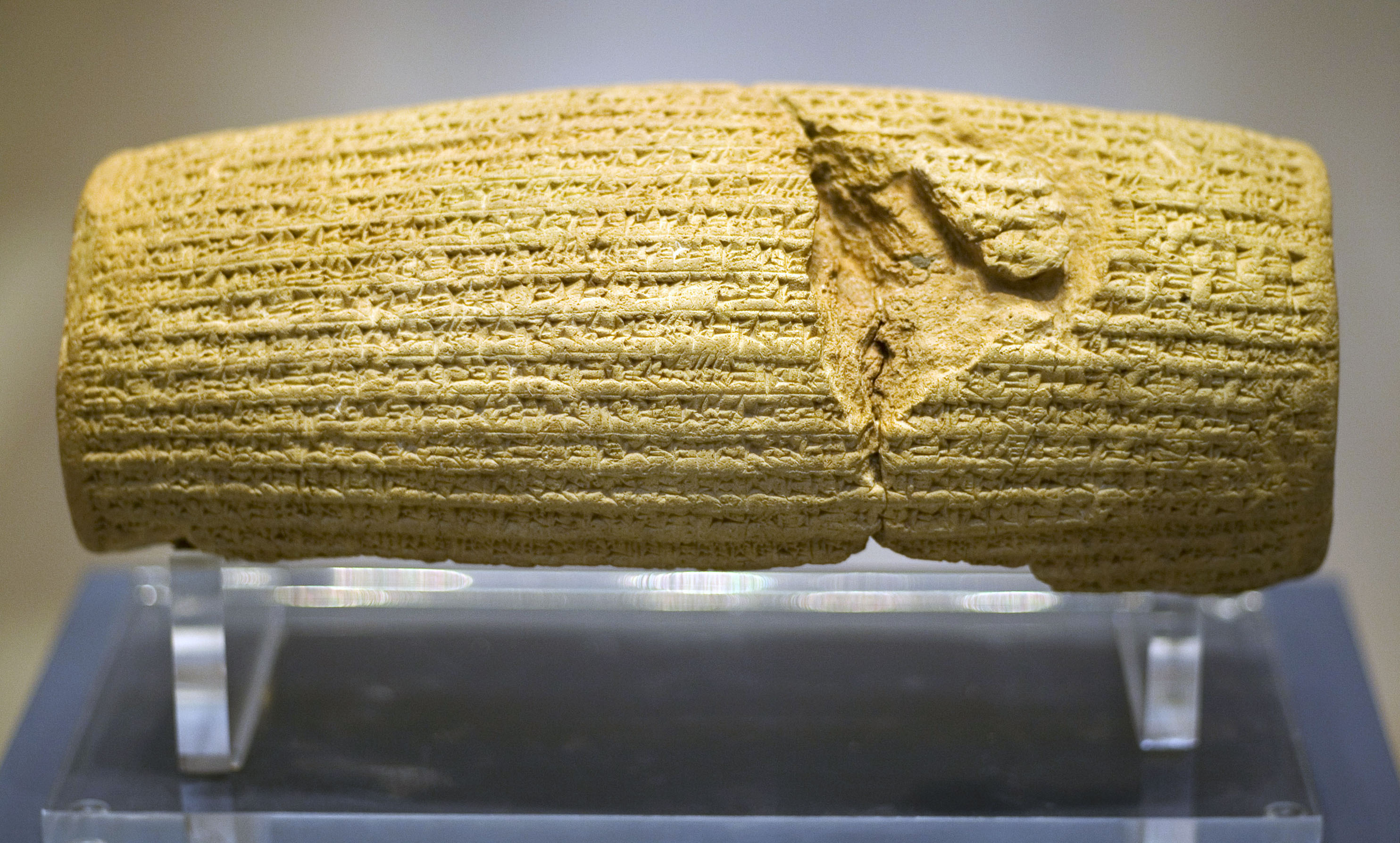
The Cyrus Cylinder of Cyrus the Great, founder of the Achaemenid Persian Empire

Many historians suggest that the Achaemenid Persian Empire of ancient Iran established unprecedented principles of human rights in the 6th century BC under Cyrus the Great. After his conquest of the Neo-Babylonian Empire in 539 BC, the king issued the Cyrus cylinder, discovered in 1879 and seen by some today as the first human rights document. The cylinder has been linked by some commentators to the decrees of Cyrus recorded in the Books of Chronicles, Nehemiah, and Ezra, which state that Cyrus allowed (at least some of) the Jews to return to their homeland from their Babylonian Captivity. Additionally it stated the freedom to practice one's faith without persecution and forced conversions. According to art historian Neil MacGregor, the proclamation of full religious freedoms in Babylon and elsewhere in the Persian empire was an important inspiration for human rights by prominent thinkers millennia later, especially in the United States.

In opposition to the above viewpoint, the interpretation of the Cylinder as a "charter of human rights" has been dismissed by other historians and characterized by some others as political propaganda devised by the Pahlavi regime. The German historian Josef Wiesehöfer argues that the image of "Cyrus as a champion of the UN human rights policy ... is just as much a phantom as the humane and enlightened Shah of Persia", while historian Elton L. Daniel has described such an interpretation as "rather anachronistic" and tendentious. The cylinder now lies in the British Museum, and a replica is kept at the United Nations Headquarters.

Many thinkers point to the concept of citizenship beginning in the early poleis of ancient Greece, where all free citizens had the right to speak and vote in the political assembly. Aristotle discusses political rights in books 3 and 6 of his Politics.

The Twelve Tables Law established the principle "Privilegia ne irroganto", which literally means "privileges shall not be imposed".

The Mauryan Emperor Ashoka, who ruled from 268 to 232 BCE, established the largest empire in South Asia. Following the reportedly destructive Kalinga War, Ashoka adopted Buddhism and abandoned an expansionist policy in favor of humanitarian reforms. The Edicts of Ashoka were erected throughout his empire, containing the 'Law of Piety'. These laws prohibited religious discrimination, and cruelty against both humans and animals. The Edicts emphasize the importance of tolerance in public policy by the government. The slaughter or capture of prisoners of war was also condemned by Ashoka. Some sources claim that slavery was also non-existent in ancient India. The Greek records say there is absence of slavery during the rule of Sandrocottus.

In ancient Rome an ius gentium or jus gentium was a right which a citizen was due simply by dint of his citizenship. The concept of a Roman ius is a precursor to a right as conceived in the Western European tradition. The word "justice" is derived from ius. Human rights legislation in the Roman Empire included the introduction of the presumption of innocence by Emperor Antoninus Pius and the Edict of Milan by Emperor Constantine the Great establishing complete freedom of religion.

The coining of the phrase 'Human rights' can be attributed to Tertullian in his letter To Scapula wherein he wrote about the religious freedom in Roman Empire. He equated "fundamental human rights" as a "privilege of nature" in this letter.

=== Early Islamic caliphate ===
Historians generally agree that Muhammad preached against what he saw as the social evils of his day, and that Islamic social reforms in areas such as social security, family structure, slavery, and the rights of women and ethnic minorities were intended to improve on what was present in existing Arab society at the time. For example, according to Bernard Lewis, Islam "from the first denounced aristocratic privilege, rejected hierarchy, and adopted a formula of the career open to the talents." John Esposito sees Muhammad as a reformer who condemned practices of the pagan Arabs such as female infanticide, exploitation of the poor, usury, murder, false contracts, and theft. Bernard Lewis believes that the egalitarian nature of Islam "represented a very considerable advance on the practice of both the Greco-Roman and the ancient Persian world." Muhammed also incorporated Arabic and Mosaic laws and customs of the time into his divine revelations.

The Constitution of Medina, also known as the Charter of Medina, was drafted by Muhammad in 622. It constituted a formal agreement between Muhammad and all of the significant tribes and families of Yathrib (later known as Medina), including Muslims, Jews, and pagans. The document was drawn up with the explicit concern of bringing to an end the bitter intertribal fighting between the clans of the Aws (Aus) and Khazraj within Medina. To this effect it instituted a number of rights and responsibilities for the Muslim, Jewish and pagan communities of Medina bringing them within the fold of one community-the Ummah.

If the prisoners were in the custody of a person, then the responsibility was on the individual. Lewis states that Islam brought two major changes to ancient slavery which were to have far-reaching consequences. "One of these was the presumption of freedom; the other, the ban on the enslavement of free persons except in strictly defined circumstances," Lewis continues. The position of the Arabian slave was "enormously improved": the Arabian slave "was now no longer merely a chattel but was also a human being with a certain religious and hence a social status and with certain quasi-legal rights."

Esposito states that reforms in women's rights affected marriage, divorce and inheritance. Women were not accorded with such legal status in other cultures, including the West, until centuries later. The Oxford Dictionary of Islam states that the general improvement of the status of Arab women included prohibition of female infanticide and recognizing women's full personhood. "The dowry, previously regarded as a bride-price paid to the father, became a nuptial gift retained by the wife as part of her personal property." Under Islamic law, marriage was no longer viewed as a "status" but rather as a "contract", in which the woman's consent was imperative. "Women were given inheritance rights in a patriarchal society that had previously restricted inheritance to male relatives." Annemarie Schimmel states that "compared to the pre-Islamic position of women, Islamic legislation meant an enormous progress; the woman has the right, at least according to the letter of the law, to administer the wealth she has brought into the family or has earned by her own work." William Montgomery Watt states that Muhammad, in the historical context of his time, can be seen as a figure who testified on behalf of women's rights and improved things considerably. Watt explains: "At the time Islam began, the conditions of women were terrible—they had no right to own property, were supposed to be the property of the man, and if the man died everything went to his sons." Muhammad, however, by "instituting rights of property ownership, inheritance, education and divorce, gave women certain basic safeguards." Haddad and Esposito state that "Muhammad granted women rights and privileges in the sphere of family life, marriage, education, and economic endeavors, rights that help improve women's status in society." However, other writers have argued that women before Islam were more liberated drawing most often on the first marriage of Muhammad and that of Muhammad's parents, but also on other points such as worship of female idols at Mecca.

Sociologist Robert Bellah (Beyond belief) argues that Islam in its 7th-century origins was, for its time and place, "remarkably modern...in the high degree of commitment, involvement, and participation expected from the rank-and-file members of the community." This is because, he argues, that Islam emphasized the equality of all Muslims, where leadership positions were open to all. Dale Eickelman writes that Bellah suggests "the early Islamic community placed a particular value on individuals, as opposed to collective or group responsibility."

Early Islamic law's principles concerning military conduct and the treatment of prisoners of war under the early Caliphate are considered precursors to international humanitarian law. The many requirements on how prisoners of war should be treated included, for example, providing shelter, food and clothing, respecting their cultures, and preventing any acts of execution, rape or revenge. Some of these principles were not codified in Western international law until modern times. Islamic law under the early Caliphate institutionalised humanitarian limitations on military conduct, including attempts to limit the severity of war, guidelines for ceasing hostilities, distinguishing between civilians and combatants, preventing unnecessary destruction, and caring for the sick and wounded.

=== Middle Ages ===
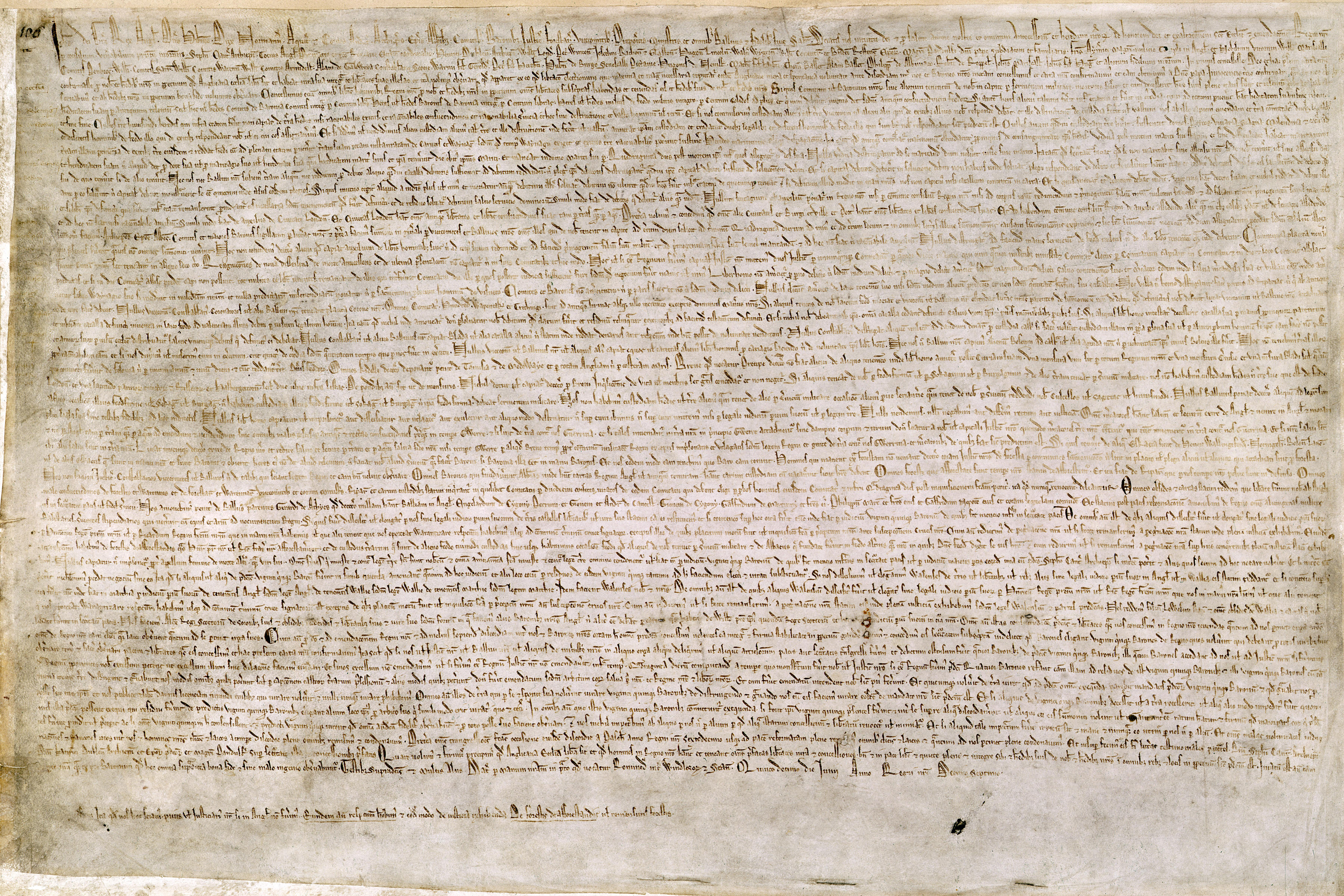
Magna Carta was written in 1215

==== Europe ====
The concept of human rights in the medieval ages built on the natural law tradition. This tradition was heavily influenced by the writings of St Paul's early Christian thinkers such as St Hilary of Poitiers, St Ambrose, and St Augustine. Augustine was among the earliest to examine the legitimacy of the laws of man, and attempt to define the boundaries of what laws and rights occur naturally based on wisdom and conscience, instead of being arbitrarily imposed by mortals, and if people are obligated to obey laws that are unjust.

The Cáin Adomnáin ("Law of Adomnán"), also known as the Lex Innocentium (Law of Innocents), was promulgated amongst a gathering of Gaelic and Pictish notables at the Synod of Birr in 697. It is named after its initiator Adomnán of Iona, ninth Abbot of Iona after St. Columba. It is called the "Geneva Accords" of the ancient Irish and Europe's first human rights treaty, for its protection of women and non-combatants.

These medieval traditions continued and influenced Magna Carta, an English charter originally issued in 1215 which in turn influenced the development of the common law and many later constitutional documents related to human rights, such as the 1689 English Bill of Rights, the 1789 United States Constitution, and the 1791 United States Bill of Rights.

Magna Carta was originally written because of disagreements between Pope Innocent III, King John and the English barons about the rights of the King. Magna Carta required the King to renounce certain rights, respect certain legal procedures and accept that his will could be bound by the law. It explicitly protected certain rights of the King's subjects, whether free or fettered—most notably the writ of habeas corpus, allowing appeal against unlawful imprisonment.

For modern times, the most enduring legacy of Magna Carta is considered the right of habeas corpus. This right arises from what are now known as clauses 36, 38, 39, and 40 of the 1215 Magna Carta. Magna Carta also included the right to due process:

No Freeman shall be taken or imprisoned, or be disseised of his Freehold, or Liberties, or free Customs, or be outlawed, or exiled, or any other wise destroyed; nor will We not pass upon him, nor condemn him, but by lawful judgment of his Peers, or by the Law of the Land. We will sell to no man, we will not deny or defer to any man either Justice or Right.

— Clause XXIX of Magna Carta

The statute of Kalisz (1264), bestowed privileges to the Jewish minority in the Kingdom of Poland such as protection from discrimination and hate speech.

At the Council of Constance (1414–1418), scholar and jurist Pawel Wlodkowic delivered an address from his Tractatus de potestate papae et imperatoris respectu infidelium ("Treatise on the Power of the Pope and the Emperor Respecting Infidels") in which he advocated the peaceful coexistence of Christians and pagans, making him a precursor of religious tolerance in Europe.

==== Africa ====
The Kouroukan Fouga was the constitution of the Mali Empire. It was composed in the 13th century, and was one of the very first charters on human rights. It included the "right to life and to the preservation of physical integrity" and significant protections for women.

== Early modern period and modern foundations ==
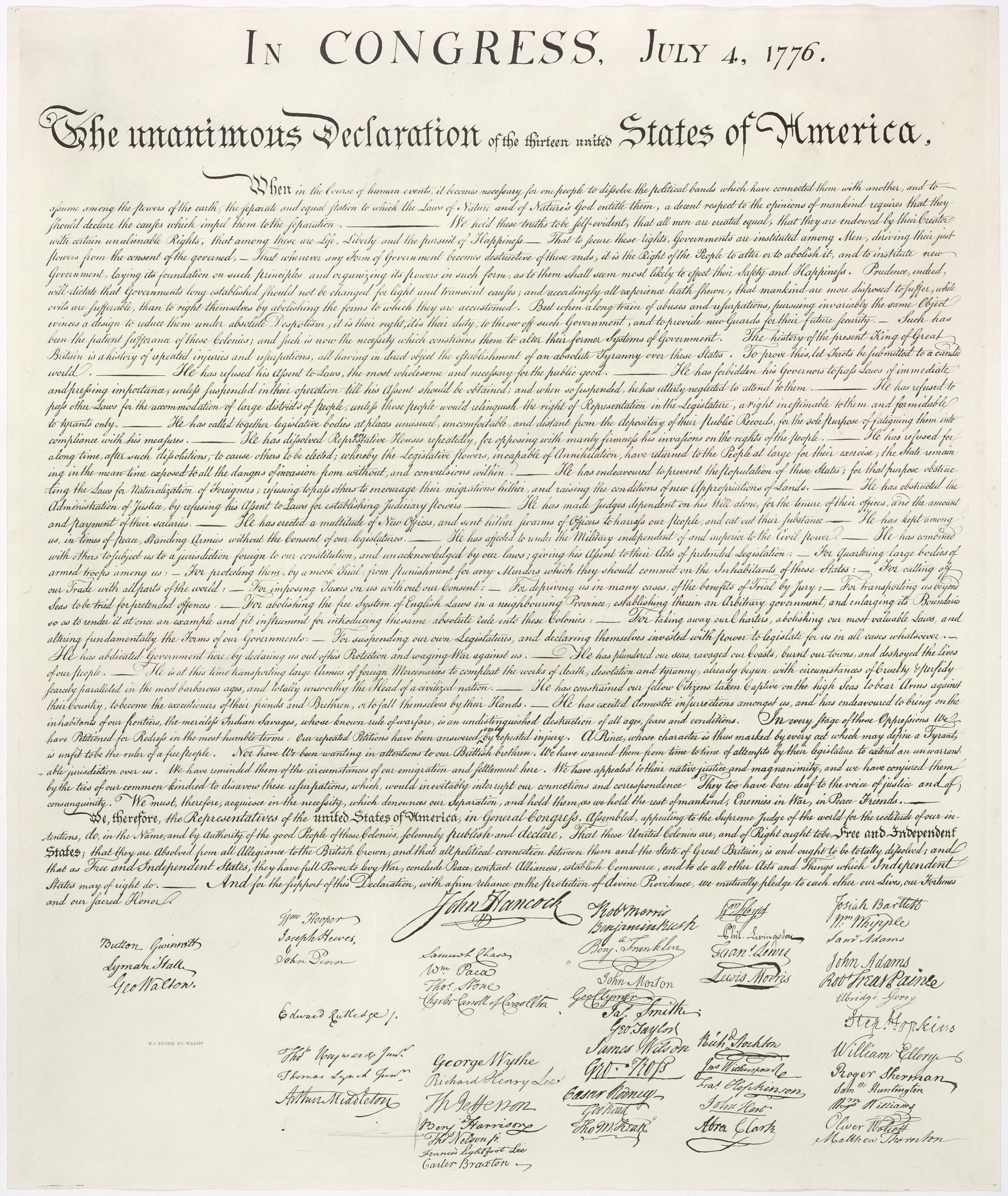
United States Declaration of Independence ratified by the Continental Congress on July 4, 1776

=== Age of Discovery, early modern period and Age of Enlightenment ===
The conquest of the Americas in the 15th and 16th centuries by Spain, during the Age of Discovery, resulted in vigorous debate about human rights in Colonial Spanish America. This led to the issuance of the Laws of Burgos by Ferdinand the Catholic on behalf of his daughter, Joanna of Castile. Friar Antonio de Montesinos, a Friar of the Dominican Order at the Island of Hispaniola, delivered a sermon on December 21, 1511, which was attended by Bartolomé de las Casas. It is believed that reports from the Dominicans in Hispaniola motivated the Spanish Crown to act. The sermon, known as the Christmas Sermon, gave way to further debates from 1550 to 1551 between Las Casas and Juan Ginés de Sepúlveda at Valladolid. Among the provisions of the Laws of Burgos were child labor; women's rights; wages; suitable accommodations; and rest/vacation, among others.

Several 17th- and 18th-century European philosophers, most notably John Locke, developed the concept of natural rights, the notion that people are naturally free and equal. Locke believed natural rights were derived from divinity since humans were creations of God, and his ideas were important in the development of the modern notion of rights. Lockean natural rights did not rely on citizenship nor any law of the state, nor were they necessarily limited to one particular ethnic, cultural or religious group. Around the same time, in 1689, the English Bill of Rights was created which asserted some basic human rights, most famously freedom from cruel and unusual punishment.

In the 1700s, the novel became a popular form of entertainment. Popular novels, such as Julie, or the New Heloise by Jean-Jacques Rousseau and Pamela; or, Virtue Rewarded by Samuel Richardson, laid a foundation for popular acceptance of human rights by making readers empathize with characters unlike themselves.

Two major revolutions occurred during the 18th century in the United States (1776) and in France (1789). The Virginia Declaration of Rights of 1776 sets up a number of fundamental rights and freedoms. The later United States Declaration of Independence includes concepts of natural rights and famously states "that all men are created equal, that they are endowed by their Creator with certain unalienable rights, that among these are life, liberty and the pursuit of happiness"; this was followed in 1789 by the United States Bill of Rights, that enumerated specific rights, such as freedom of speech and the right against self-incrimination. Similarly, the French Declaration of the Rights of Man and of the Citizen defines a set of individual and collective rights of the people. These are, in the document, held to be universal—not only to French citizens but to all men without exception.

=== 19th century to World War I ===
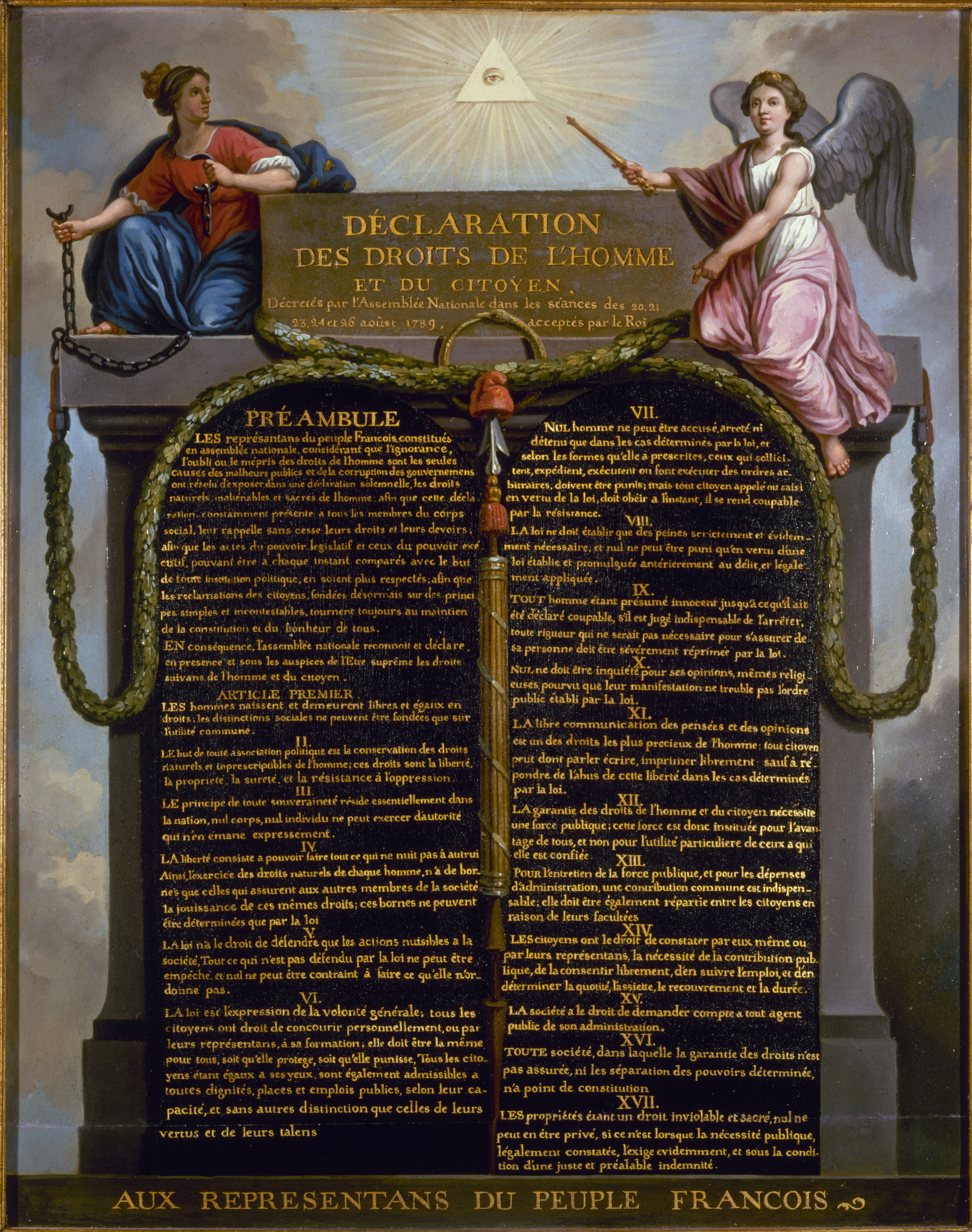
Declaration of the Rights of Man and of the Citizen approved by the National Assembly of France, August 26, 1789

Philosophers such as Thomas Paine, John Stuart Mill and Hegel expanded on the theme of universality during the 18th and 19th centuries.

In 1831 William Lloyd Garrison wrote in The Liberator newspaper that he was trying to enlist his readers in "the great cause of human rights" so the term human rights may have come into use sometime between Paine's The Rights of Man and Garrison's publication. In 1849, a contemporary, Henry David Thoreau, wrote about human rights in his treatise On the Duty of Civil Disobedience which was later influential on human rights and civil rights thinkers. United States Supreme Court Justice David Davis, in his 1867 opinion for Ex parte Milligan, wrote: "By the protection of the law, human rights are secured; withdraw that protection and they are at the mercy of wicked rulers or the clamor of an excited people."

Many groups and movements have managed to achieve profound social changes over the course of the 20th century in the name of human rights. In Western Europe and North America, labour unions brought about laws granting workers the right to strike, establishing safer work conditions and forbidding or regulating child labor. The women's suffrage movement succeeded in gaining for many women the right to vote. National liberation movements in the Global South succeeded in gaining many countries independence from Western colonialism, one of the most influential being Mahatma Gandhi's leadership of the Indian independence movement. Movements by ethnic and religious minorities for racial and religious equality succeeded in many parts of the world, among them the American civil rights movement, and more recent diverse identity politics movements, on behalf of women and minorities which have occurred around the world.

The foundation of the International Committee of the Red Cross, the 1864 Lieber Code and the first of the Geneva Conventions in 1864 laid the foundations of international humanitarian law, to be further developed following the two World Wars.

Auguries of United Nations human rights law have been located in the late-19th century movement to suppress and abolish slavery across the world as well as in the conventional protection of minorities from religious, racial, and national discrimination within states under the auspices of unilateral, bilateral, and multilateral treaty law, first found in the 1878 Treaty of Berlin.

Pope Leo XIII's Apostolic Exhortation Rerum Novarum in 1891 marked the official beginning of Catholic Social Teaching. The document was principally concerned with discussing workers' rights, property rights, and citizens' rights against State intrusion. From that time forward, popes (and Vatican II) would release apostolic exhortations and encyclicals on topics that touched on human rights more and more frequently.

The proposition that a state's agents could be held criminally responsible for atrocities perpetrated against the state's own nationals was advanced by the British, French, and Russian governments in May 1915 in response to Turkey's genocide of Armenians.

=== Between World War I and World War II ===
The League of Nations was established in 1919 at the negotiations over the Treaty of Versailles following the end of World War I. The League's goals included disarmament, preventing war through collective security, settling disputes between countries through negotiation, diplomacy and improving global welfare. Enshrined in its Charter was a mandate to promote many of the rights which were later included in the Universal Declaration of Human Rights.

The League of Nations had mandates to support many of the former colonies of the Western European colonial powers during their transition from colony to independent state.

Established as an agency of the League of Nations, and now part of United Nations, the International Labour Organization also had a mandate to promote and safeguard certain of the rights later included in the UDHR:

the primary goal of the ILO today is to promote opportunities for women and men to obtain decent and productive work, in conditions of freedom, equity, security and human dignity.

— Report by the Director General for the International Labour Conference 87th Session

Also of particular note is the ILO's 1919 convention protecting women from pregnancy discrimination in employment, the 1921 Right of Association (Agriculture) Convention, and the 1930 Forced Labour Convention.

== Modern human rights movement ==
=== After World War II ===
==== Rights in war and the extension of the Geneva Conventions ====
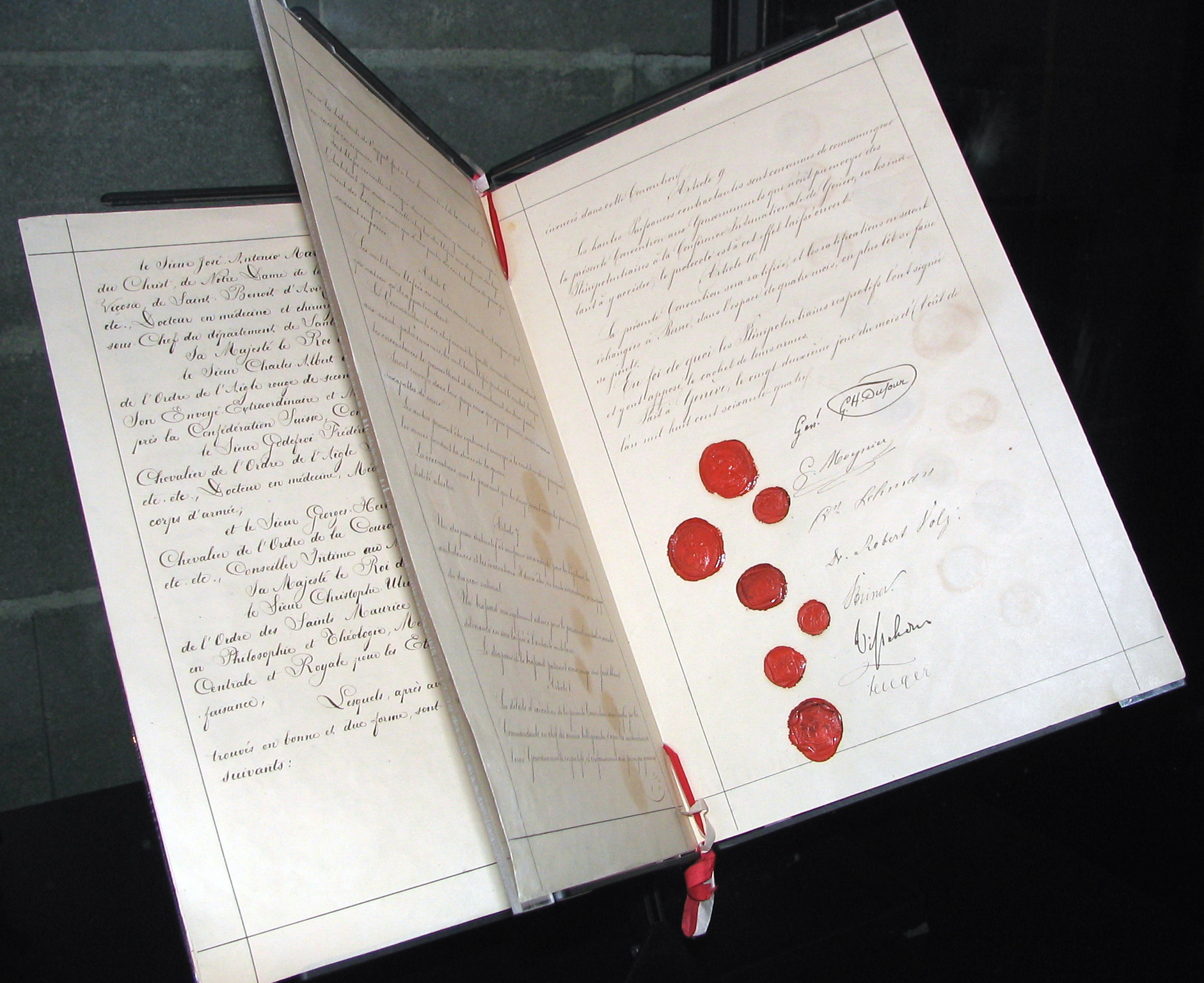
Original Geneva Convention in 1864

Progression of Geneva Conventions from 1864 to 1949

The Geneva Conventions came into being between 1864 and 1949 as a result of efforts by Henry Dunant, the founder of the International Committee of the Red Cross. The conventions safeguard the human rights of individuals involved in conflict, and follow on from the 1899 and 1907 Hague Conventions, the international community's first attempt to define laws of war. Despite first being framed before World War II, the conventions were revised as a result of World War II and readopted by the international community in 1949.

The Geneva Conventions are:

- The Geneva Convention for the Amelioration of the Condition of the Wounded and Sick in Armed Forces in the Field was adopted in 1864. It was significantly revised and replaced by the 1906 version, the 1929 version, and later the First Geneva Convention of 1949.
- The Geneva Convention for the Amelioration of the Condition of Wounded, Sick and Shipwrecked Members of Armed Forces at Sea was adopted in 1906. It was significantly revised and replaced by the Second Geneva Convention of 1949.
- The Geneva Convention relative to the Treatment of Prisoners of War was adopted in 1929. It was significantly revised and replaced by the Third Geneva Convention of 1949.
- The Fourth Geneva Convention relative to the Protection of Civilian Persons in Time of War was adopted in 1949.

In addition, there are three additional amendment protocols to the Geneva Convention:

- Protocol I (1977): Protocol Additional to the Geneva Conventions of 12 August 1949, and relating to the Protection of Victims of International Armed Conflicts.
- Protocol II (1977): Protocol Additional to the Geneva Conventions of 12 August 1949, and relating to the Protection of Victims of Non-International Armed Conflicts.
- Protocol III (2005): Protocol Additional to the Geneva Conventions of 12 August 1949, and relating to the Adoption of an Additional Distinctive Emblem.

All four conventions were last revised and ratified in 1949, based on previous revisions and partly on some of the 1907 Hague Conventions. Later, conferences have added provisions prohibiting certain methods of warfare and addressing issues of civil wars. Nearly all 200 countries of the world are "signatory" nations, in that they have ratified these conventions. The International Committee of the Red Cross is the controlling body of the Geneva conventions.

==== Universal Declaration of Human Rights ====
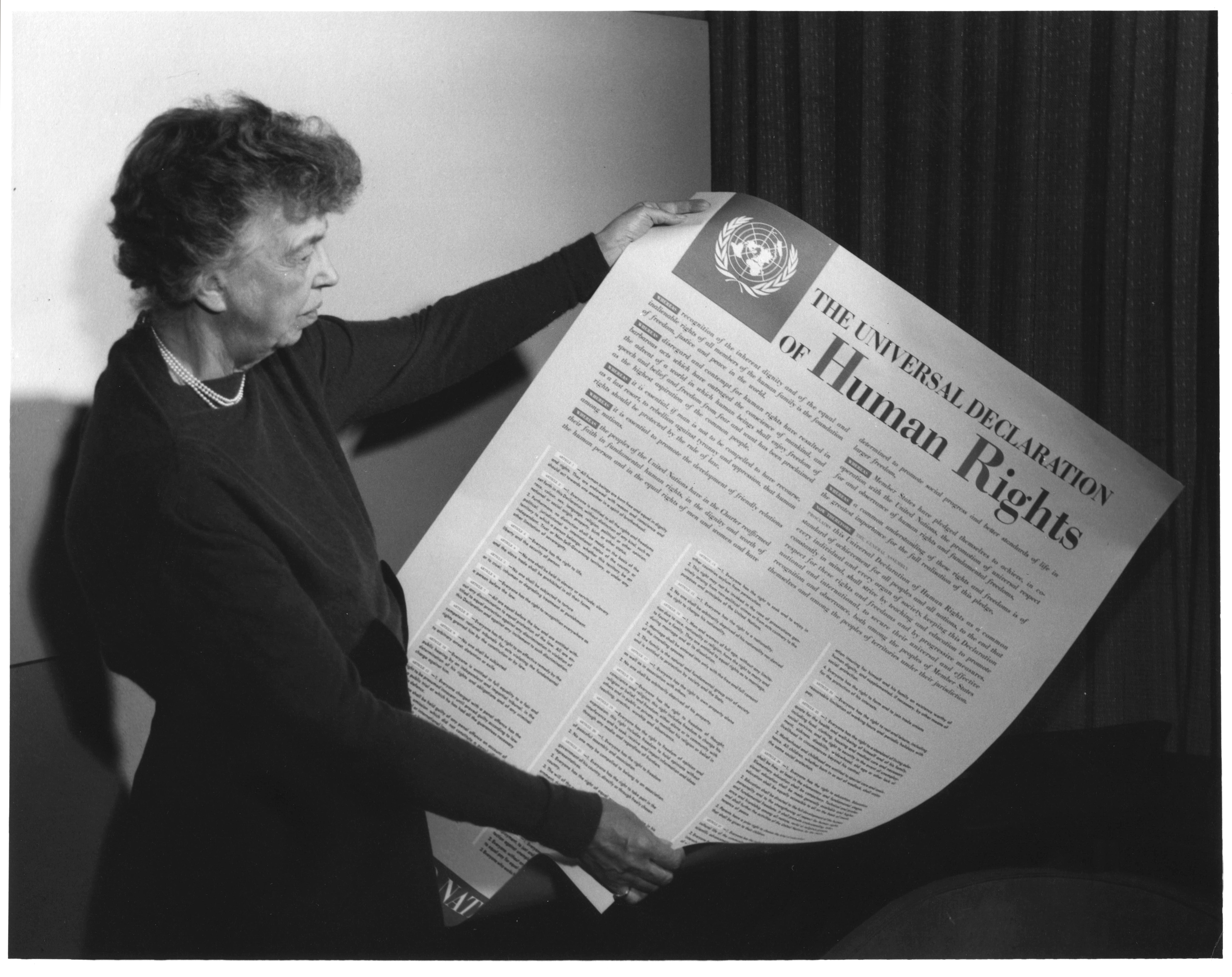
"It is not a treaty... [In the future, it] may well become the international Magna Carta." Eleanor Roosevelt with the text of the Universal Declaration of Human Rights in 1949.

The Universal Declaration of Human Rights is a non-binding declaration adopted by the United Nations General Assembly in 1948, partly in response to the barbarism of World War II. The Declaration urges member nations to promote a number of human, civil, economic and social rights, asserting these rights are part of the "foundation of freedom, justice and peace in the world". It was declared by the United Nations General Assembly to be a common standard of achievements for all peoples and all nations. It sets forth, for the first time in history, fundamental human rights to be universally protected.

...recognition of the inherent dignity and of the equal and inalienable rights of all members of the human family is the foundation of freedom, justice and peace in the world

— Preamble to the Universal Declaration of Human Rights, 1948

The Universal Declaration of Human Rights was framed by members of the Human Rights Commission, with Eleanor Roosevelt as Chair, who began to discuss an "International Bill of Rights" in 1947. The members of the Commission did not immediately agree on the form of such a bill of rights, and whether, or how, it should be enforced. The Commission proceeded to frame the UDHR and accompanying treaties, but the UDHR quickly became the priority. Canadian law professor John Humphrey and French lawyer Rene Cassin were responsible for much of the cross-national research and the structure of the document respectively, where the articles of the declaration were interpretative of the general principle of the preamble. The document was structured by Cassin to include the basic principles of dignity, liberty, equality and brotherhood in the first two articles, followed successively by rights pertaining to individuals; rights of individuals in relation to each other and to groups; spiritual, public and political rights; and economic, social and cultural rights. The final three articles place, according to Cassin, rights in the context of limits, duties and the social and political order in which they are to be realized. Humphrey and Cassin intended the rights in the UDHR to be legally enforceable through some means, as is reflected in the third clause of the preamble:

Whereas it is essential, if man is not to be compelled to have recourse, as a last resort, to rebellion against tyranny and oppression, that human rights should be protected by the rule of law.

— Preamble to the Universal Declaration of Human Rights, 1948

Some of the Declaration was researched and written by a committee of international experts on human rights, including representatives from all continents and all major religions, and drawing on consultation with leaders such as Mahatma Gandhi. The inclusion of both civil and political rights and economic, social and cultural rights was predicated on the assumption that basic human rights are indivisible and that the different types of rights listed are inextricably linked. Though this principle was not opposed by any member states at the time of adoption (the declaration was adopted unanimously, with the abstention of the Soviet Bloc, Apartheid South Africa and Saudi Arabia), this principle was later subject to significant challenges.

==== European Convention on Human Rights ====
The UN declaration was succeeded by the European Convention on Human Rights, a binding convention drafted by the Council of Europe in 1950 and signed by 47 countries. The Convention has 18 articles, 13 of which are rights guaranteed under it:

- Right to life – All human beings have a right to live without being subjected to unlawful killing, the exception being lawful self-defence or defence of another. Under this article all states have a responsibility to investigate suspicious deaths and take positive action to prevent loss of life in certain circumstances.
- Prohibition of torture – Without exception, nobody can be subjected to torture or "cruel and degrading treatment".
- Prohibition of slavery – Slavery, servitude and forced labour are forbidden unless part of legal penal servitude, compulsory military service or required to be done during a state of emergency.
- Right to liberty and security – All people have a right to liberty except in the context of judicial imprisonment. The article also provides those arrested with the right to be informed, in a language they understand, of the reasons for the arrest and any charge they face, the right of prompt access to judicial proceedings to determine the legality of the arrest or detention, to trial within a reasonable time or release pending trial, and the right to compensation in the case of arrest or detention in violation of this article.
- Right to a fair trial – Anybody accused of a crime has the right to a public hearing before an independent and impartial tribunal within reasonable time, the presumption of innocence, and other minimum rights for those charged with a criminal offence (adequate time and facilities to prepare their defence, access to legal representation, right to examine witnesses against them or have them examined, right to the free assistance of an interpreter)
- Freedom from retroactive punishment – Nobody can be prosecuted for an act or omission that was not illegal under national or international law at the time.
- Right to privacy – Under the ECHR, all people have a right to respect for one's "private and family life, his home and his correspondence" as long as none of it violates the law. Among other things, this article forbids illegal police searches and legally protects private sexual activity.
- Freedom of thought, conscience and religion – All people have a right to freely express their beliefs as long as those beliefs are not illegal, to change their religion, and to express religious belief through worship, teaching, practice and observance.
- Freedom of assembly – All people have a right to form or join any group or organization for any purpose as long as that purpose is not illegal.
- Right to marriage – All men and women of marriageable age have a right to marry and form a family. Controversially this protection only applies to heterosexual couples.
- Freedom of expression – All people may freely express their opinions and impart and receive information except in certain extreme circumstances.
- Freedom from discrimination – Protects rights defined elsewhere in the convention from being denied on the basis of sex, race, colour, language, religion, political or other opinions, national or social origin, association with a national minority, property, birth or other status. 20 of the 47 signatories adhere to an additional protocol extending this to cover discrimination in any legal right.
- Right to remedy – Anybody who believes their rights have been violated may petition the European Court of Human Rights to have their case heard and their grievances addressed and redressed.

The other five articles address enforcement of the rights enumerated in the convention and special circumstances in which these rights can be restricted. The United Kingdom, one of the signatories of the ECHR, later passed the Human Rights Act 1998 enshrining these rights in UK law and giving the judiciary the ability to enforce them under UK law.

=== Late 20th century ===
We have already found a high degree of personal liberty, and we are now struggling to enhance equality of opportunity. Our commitment to human rights must be absolute, our laws fair, our natural beauty preserved; the powerful must not persecute the weak, and human dignity must be enhanced.

— Jimmy Carter Inaugural Address.

According to historian Samuel Moyn the next major landmark in human rights happened in the 1970s. Human rights were included in point VII of the Helsinki Accords, which was signed in 1975 by thirty-five states, including the United States, Canada, and all European states except Albania and Andorra.

During his inaugural speech in 1977, the 39th President of the United States Jimmy Carter made human rights a pillar of United States foreign policy. Human rights advocacy organization Amnesty International later won the Nobel Peace Prize also in 1977. Carter, who was instrumental to the Camp David accord peace treaty would himself win the Nobel Peace Prize in 2002 "for his decades of untiring effort to find peaceful solutions to international conflicts, to advance democracy and human rights, and to promote economic and social development".

Karel Vasak proposed a categorization to illustrate, more or less, how human rights evolved throughout the 20th century. He identified three generations of human rights: first-generation civil and political rights (e.g., the right to life and political participation), second-generation economic, social, and cultural rights (e.g., the right to subsistence), and third-generation solidarity rights (e.g., the rights to peace and a clean environment). The third generation remains the most debated, lacking both legal and political recognition.

=== 21st century ===
Human rights advocacy has continued into the early 21st century, centred around achieving greater economic and political freedom. In July 2022, the United Nations General Assembly adopted a resolution in which it is recognized that everyone on the planet has a right to a healthy environment. It called on states to step up efforts to ensure their people have access to a "clean, healthy and sustainable environment."

Several authors advocate in this century for the recognition of new generations of human rights, though its content remains unclear and lacks a unified proposal. These new groups of rights encompasses rights related to technological advancements, digital rights, and broader concepts of humanity's relationship with technology and the environment. Suggested rights include equal access to digital resources, digital self-determination, security, and control over personal data.

Some theorists, particularly in India and Africa (e.g., the Ubuntu philosophy), consider imperative to shift from an individualistic and societal approach to rights toward a more communitarian perspective. Other scholars advocate grounding human rights in the inherent dignity and relational nature of the human person. Finally, some authors seek to integrate these perspectives by rooting human rights in a deeper understanding of the "human person." For example, David Walsh emphasizes that the person is fundamentally a relational being, combining in this way the best of the individualistic, societal, and communitarian approaches.

Drawing on this relational perspective and rooted in Leonardo Polo's anthropology, Juan Carlos Riofrio calls for a reimagining of human rights that emphasizes the co-existential nature of the person, described as freedom, light, and love. Through this lens, he introduces novel rights, such as the rights to hope, friendship, dialogue, feast and festivals, arguing that these fundamental aspects of human life have the potential to transform human rights.

== See also ==
- Asian values
- Cairo Declaration on Human Rights in Islam
- World Conference on Human Rights
