= Property law =

Area of laws governing ownership of real and personal property

Property law is the area of law that governs legal rights, including ownership and tenure, in property. Legal systems generally recognise two major kinds of property: property that relates to land, often called real property; and property that does not, which may include personal property. Depending on jurisdiction, personal property either is synonymous with tangible property, which may include money, or can be further divided into tangible and intangible property, which includes intellectual property.

Property law relates to the acquisition, divestment, and enforcement of proprietary rights. As these rights usually involve relationships between private individuals, property law is largely an area of private law, although public law aspects of property law include such issues as compulsory land acquisition, wealth redistribution, environmental effects, antitrust or economic competition, indigenous rights, and the human rights to property and housing.

The property law of common law jurisdictions originate in medieval English law, which developed under two separate systems of court, equity and common law, each with its set of proprietary rules. Civil law jurisdictions, on the other hand, trace their proprietary origins to the Roman law, although the two legal traditions interact with and influence one another. The most significant doctrinal influence across the two systems is the reception of the trust into civilian jurisdictions

== History ==
=== Roman law ===
Roman law developed one of the most sophisticated and influential systems of property regulation in legal history, forming the conceptual foundation of most modern civil law traditions. Its treatment of ownership, possession, and the classification of things continues to inform contemporary legal thought in continental Europe and beyond.

=== Dominium: The Concept of Ownership ===
At the heart of Roman property law stood the concept of dominium, the exclusive right of ownership over a thing (res). Unlike modern systems that often recognize divided or relative forms of ownership, Roman law conceived of dominium as a unified and near-absolute right, encompassing the power to use (usus), enjoy the fruits of (fructus), and dispose of (abusus) property. This conception profoundly influenced the later civil law notion of ownership as a single, comprehensive right, in contrast to the fragmented, relational approach characteristic of English common law.

=== Classification of Things (Res) ===
Roman jurists devoted considerable attention to classifying property. A fundamental distinction was drawn between res mancipi and res nec mancipi. The former category included items of particular economic importance in early agrarian society, such as land in Italy, slaves, and beasts of burden, and required a formal ceremony called mancipatio for valid transfer; res nec mancipi, encompassing most other movable goods, could be transferred through simple delivery (traditio). This distinction gradually lost significance and was abolished under Justinian. Other classifications included the division between res corporales (tangible things) and res incorporales (intangible rights, such as inheritance or servitudes), as well as between res mobiles and res immobiles, and between res in commercio and res extra commercium.

=== Possession and Its Protection ===
Roman law carefully distinguished possessio (possession) from dominium (ownership). Possession referred to the physical control of a thing coupled with the intent to hold it as one's own (animus possidendi), and it enjoyed independent legal protection through possessory interdicts, regardless of whether the possessor was the true owner. This separation allowed Roman law to protect social order and prevent self-help remedies, while reserving disputes over ultimate title for separate proceedings, such as the rei vindicatio, the principal action by which an owner could recover property from a non-owning possessor.

=== Modes of Acquiring Ownership ===
Roman law recognized both original and derivative modes of acquiring ownership. Original acquisition included occupatio (taking possession of ownerless things), accessio (the union of one thing with another), and usucapio (acquisition through prolonged possession, a precursor to modern adverse possession and prescription). Derivative acquisition occurred through mancipatio, in iure cessio (a fictitious lawsuit transferring ownership), and traditio, the informal delivery of possession with intent to transfer ownership, which became the dominant mode of transfer in later Roman law.

=== Servitudes and Limited Rights ===
Beyond full ownership, Roman law developed an elaborate system of lesser real rights (iura in re aliena), including servitudes (servitutes), which granted limited use-rights over another's property, such as rights of way (iter) or water access (aquaeductus); usufructus, granting the right to use and enjoy another's property without altering its substance; and later, emphyteusis and superficies, long-term rights over land and buildings that anticipated modern leasehold concepts.

=== Legacy ===
Roman property law, particularly as codified in Justinian's Corpus Juris Civilis, was rediscovered and extensively studied during the medieval revival of Roman law and subsequently incorporated into the civil codes of continental Europe, including the French Code Civil and the German Bürgerliches Gesetzbuch. Its conceptual vocabulary—ownership, possession, usufruct, servitude—remains foundational to property law in civil law jurisdictions worldwide.

== Theory ==
The word property, in everyday usage, refers to an object that belongs to a person. In law and finance, property is often conceptualised differently as relating to or comprising the rights that a person has over something and not the thing in itself.

=== Property and proprietary rights ===
In his Second Treatise on Government, English philosopher John Locke asserted the right of an individual to own one part of the world, given that, according to the Bible, God gave the world to all humanity in common. Locke claimed that although persons belong to God, they own the fruits of their labor; when a person works, that labor enters into the object. Thus, the object becomes the property of that person. Locke conditioned ownership of property on the Lockean proviso, that is, "there is enough, and as good, left in common for others".

U.S. Supreme Court Justice James Wilson undertook a survey of the philosophical grounds of American property law in 1790 and 1791. He proceeds from two premises: "Every crime includes an injury: every injury includes a violation of a right." Thus, the paramount function of government was to protect the natural rights that one had over their property, liberty, character, and safety via the provision of remedies to enforce such rights.

Communism opposes private property laws. Marxism advocates for public ownership of property. "Private property has made us so stupid and one-sided that an object is only ours when we have it – when it exists for us as capital, or when it is directly possessed, eaten, drunk, worn, inhabited, etc., – in short, when it is used by us" (Marx). However, many Marxist–Leninist societies such as China and the dissolved Soviet Union have forms of private property laws.

==== Rights in rem and in personam ====
Property rights are rights over things enforceable against all other persons. By contrast, contractual rights are rights enforceable against particular persons. Property rights may, however, arise from a contract; the two systems of rights overlap. In relation to the sale of land, for example, two sets of legal relationships exist alongside one another: the contractual right to sue for damages, and the property right exercisable over the land. More minor property rights may be created by contract, as in the case of easements, covenants, and equitable servitudes.

A separate distinction is evident where the rights granted are insufficiently substantial to confer on the nonowner a definable interest or right in the thing. The clearest example of these rights is the license. In general, even if licenses are created by a binding contract, they do not give rise to property interests.

Property rights are also distinguished from personal rights. Practically all contemporary societies acknowledge this basic ontological and ethical distinction. In the past, groups lacking political power have often been disqualified from the benefits of property. In an extreme form, this has meant that people have become "objects" of property—legally "things" or chattels (see slavery.) More commonly, marginalized groups have been denied legal rights to own property. These include Jews in England and married women in Western societies until the late 19th century.

==== Movable and immovable property ====
The division of land and chattels has been criticised as being not satisfactory as a basis for categorising the principles of property law since it concentrates attention not on the proprietary interests themselves but on the objects of those interests. Moreover, in the case of fixtures, chattels which are affixed to or placed on land may become part of the land.

Real property is generally sub-classified into corporeal hereditaments – tangible real property (land); and incorporeal hereditaments – intangible real property such as an easement of way.

Although a tenancy involves rights to real property, a leasehold estate is typically considered personal property, being derived from contract law. In the civil law system, the distinction is between movable and immovable property, with movable property roughly corresponding to personal property, while immovable property corresponding to real estate or real property, and the associated rights, and obligations thereon.

==== Theories of ownership ====
There are two main views on the right to property, the traditional view and the bundle of rights view. The traditionalists believe that there is a core, inherent meaning in the concept of property, while the bundle of rights view states that the property owner only has a bundle of permissible uses over the property. The two views exist on a spectrum and the difference may be a matter of focus and emphasis.

William Blackstone, in his Commentaries on the Laws of England, wrote that the essential core of property is the right to exclude. That is, the owner of property must be able to exclude others from the thing in question, even though the right to exclude is subject to limitations. By implication, the owner can use the thing, unless another restriction, such as zoning law, prevents it. Other traditionalists argue that three main rights define property: the right to exclusion, use and transfer.

An alternative view of property, favored by legal realists, is that property simply denotes a bundle of rights defined by law and social policy. Which rights are included in the bundle known as property rights, and which bundles are preferred to which others, is simply a matter of policy. Therefore, a government can prevent the building of a factory on a piece of land, through zoning law or criminal law, without damaging the concept of property. The "bundle of rights" view was prominent in academia in the 20th century and remains influential today in American law.

Corporations are legal non-human entities that are entitled to property rights just as an individual human is. A corporation has legal power to use and possess property just as a fictitious legal human would. However, a corporation is not a single human, it is the collective will of a group of people who provide a service or build a good. With many agent in play, there are many different and opposing interests in play with respect to ownership. The majority of property is now owned by corporations. They were created under general incorporation statutes that allow such fictitious legal persons to have property rights.

=== Law and economics ===
Merrill and Smith, the leading law and economics scholars of property, summarise the economic justifications for the existence of property rights in five reasons: First, it is an efficient way to manage resources on a decentralized basis, allowing expertise and specialization to develop with regard to the property. Second, it is a powerful incentive for owners to put it to productive use, because they stand to gain in the investment. Third, it allows exchanges and modifications. Fourth, it is a source of individual autonomy, giving individuals independence and identity distinct from others. Fifth, it allows individuals to exercise freedom, against others or against the government.

At the same time, arguments in favor of limiting private property rights include negative externalities arising from one's use of private property, anticompetitive practices that involve the use of property, an increasing commodification and financialisation of social relations and other goods that ought not to be transacted, and the creation of economic inequity.

== Land, immovable or real property ==
=== Title and types of proprietary rights ===
Different parties may claim a competing interest in the same property by mistake or by fraud, with the claims being inconsistent of each other. For example, the party creating or transferring an interest may have a valid title, but may intentionally or negligently create several interests wholly or partially inconsistent with each other. A court resolves the dispute by adjudicating the priorities of the interests.

==== Lease ====
Historically, leases served many purposes, and the regulation varied according to intended purposes and the economic conditions of the time. Leaseholds, for example, were mainly granted for agriculture until the late eighteenth century and early nineteenth century, when the growth of cities made the leasehold an important form of landholding in urban areas.

The modern law of landlord and tenant in common law jurisdictions retains the influence of the common law and, particularly, the laissez-faire philosophy that dominated the law of contract and the law of property in the 19th century. With the growth of consumerism, the law of consumer protection recognised that common law principles assuming equal bargaining power between parties may cause unfairness. Consequently, reformers have emphasised the need to assess residential tenancy laws in terms of protection they provide to tenants. Legislation to protect tenants is now common.

=== Joint ownership and concurrent estates ===
All western legal systems allow for a number of different forms of group ownership of property. Group ownership in property law is referred to as co-tenancy, or concurrent ownership. Two or more owners of a property are referred to as co-owners.

==== Concurrent owners ====
In U.S. common law, property can be owned by many different people and parties. Property can be shared by an infinitely divisible number of people. There are three types of concurrent estates, or ways people can jointly own property: joint tenancy, tenancy in common, or tenancy by entirety.

==== Joint Tenancy ====
In joint tenancy, each owner of the property has an undivided interest in it along with full and complete ownership. Each owner in joint tenancy has the full right to occupy and use all of it. If one owner dies in joint tenancy, then the other owner takes control of the deceased owner's interest.

===== Tenancy in Common =====
In tenancy in common, the shares of ownership can be equal or unequal in size. One person may own a larger share of the property than another. Even if owners own an unequal amount of shares, all owners still have the right to use all of the property. If one owner dies, their share of the property is transferred to the designated individual in their will contract.

===== Tenancy by the Entirety =====
In tenancy by the entirety, each owner of the property has an undivided interest in it along with full and complete ownership. Each spouse has the full right to occupy and use all of the property. It is only available to married couples. A spouse cannot transfer their interest in the property without the consent of the other spouse. If the couple divorces and goes to court, a judge is granted wide discretion on how to divide the share interests of the property in common-law jurisdictions.

== Movable or personal property ==
=== Possessed goods (possessio) ===
The concept of possession developed from a legal system whose principal concern was to avoid civil disorder. The general principle is that a person in possession of land or goods, even as a wrongdoer, is entitled to take action against anyone interfering with the possession unless the person interfering is able to demonstrate a superior right to do so.

In England, the Torts (Interference with Goods) Act 1977 has significantly amended the law relating to wrongful interference with goods and abolished some longstanding remedies and doctrines.

== Intangible and intellectual property ==
In the United States, a "quasi-property" interest has been explicitly declared in the dead body. Also in the United States, it has been recognised that people have an alienable proprietary "right of publicity" over their "persona". The patent/patenting of biotechnological processes and products based on human genetic material may be characterised as creating property in human life. A particularly difficult question is whether people have rights to intellectual property developed by others from their body parts. In the pioneering case on this issue, the Supreme Court of California held in Moore v. Regents of the University of California (1990) that individuals do not have such a property right.

== Sub-areas ==
=== Conveyancing ===
The term "transfer of property" means an act by which a living person, company, or state conveys property, in present or in future, to one or more other living persons, to himself and one or more other living persons, to the state, or to a private company. The transfer of property can be consensual or non-consensual, and to transfer property is to perform such an act.

==== Consensual transfers ====
The most common method of acquiring an interest in property is as the result of a consensual transaction with the previous owner, for example, a sale, a gift, or through inheritance. In law, an inheritor is a person who is entitled to receive a share of the heritor's (the person who died) property, subject to the rules of inheritance in the jurisdiction of which the heritor was a citizen or where the heritor died or owned property at the time of death. Dispositions by will may also be regarded as consensual transactions, since the effect of a will is to provide for the distribution of the deceased person's property to nominated beneficiaries. A person may also obtain an interest in property under a trust established for his or her benefit by the owner of the property.

=== Public law ===
It is also possible for property to pass from one person to another independently of the consent of the property owner. For example, this occurs when a person dies intestate, goes bankrupt, or has the property taken in execution of a court judgment.

Property can also pass from one person to the state independently of the consent of the property owner through the state's power of eminent domain. Eminent domain refers to the ability of the state to buyout private property from individuals at their will in order to use the property for public use. Eminent domain requires the state to "justly compensate" the property owner for the acquisition of their land. The practice dates back to at least the 17th century.

=== Inheritance and family law ===
In property law, economics and finance, the term "legal successor" may refer to a legally established successor of property rights (inheritance, interest) or in terms of liabilities (debt).

In the case of bankruptcy of a lender, the legal successor in interest has the right to collect the debt.

== See also ==
- Claim club
- Conversion (law)
- Detinue
- Escheat
- Ius in re
- Rei vindicatio
- Replevin
- Torrens title
- Trover
- Infectious invalidity

=== Property law in different jurisdictions ===
- Ghanaian property law
- United States property law
- English property law
- Scots property law
- South African property law
- Australian property law
- Canadian property law
