= Human rights inflation =

Criticism of human rights expansion

The concept of human-rights inflation expresses the belief that people, such as human rights activists, claim increasing numbers and varieties of human rights. For example, Karel Vasak, has theorised a development through three generations of human rights:

1. civil and political
2. socio-economic and cultural
3. solidarity-related

Commentators who identify trends of growing the cases labelled "rights" sometimes suspect that an increasing number of claims will erode the regard for those human rights which they consider more fundamental. Fears of human-rights inflation have been expressed since the mid-twentieth century. Economic and social rights are particularly likely to be cited as examples of human rights inflation.

The philosopher Zhao Tingyang argues that the prioritization of human rights above all else inevitably leads to a proliferation of claimed rights: "If a demand for certain kinds of freedoms and interests can be made into a right, then any and all demands for freedoms and interests can be made into rights on the same grounds." According to Zhao, this dynamic leads to confusion about values and can cause society to get out of control, a development which he says has already begun to emerge.
