= Property law in the United States =

Property law in the United States is the area of law that governs the various forms of ownership in real property (land and buildings) and personal property, including intangible property such as intellectual property. Property refers to legally protected claims to resources, such as land and personal property. Property can be exchanged through contract law, and if property is violated, one could sue under tort law to protect it.

== Interstate diversity ==
Property law in the United States is primarily an area of state law. There are also federal laws (for example, on patents and copyright) and some local laws as well (on areas such as zoning and tenancy). Property law in the states generally originates from the common law, especially English land law, and has been heavily modified by a variety of statutes in each state. The Restatements on Property give an overview of certain areas of property law in the United States.

All three Restatements of Property to date have been far less influential than the Restatements of Contract and Torts. The project promptly went off the rails when Harry Bigelow ended up restating Wesley Newcomb Hohfeld's ideas (e.g., the bundle of rights) instead of American property law, and his successors lacked the brilliance needed for such an ambitious project. As of 2014, the Restatement's failure to address basic doctrines like adverse possession and real estate transfers had never been corrected over 75 years, three Restatements series, and 17 volumes. In the 1970s, the Uniform Law Commission's project to standardize state real property law was a spectacular failure.

== Theory of property rights ==
=== Definition of property rights ===
There are two main views on the right to property in the United States, the traditional view and the bundle of rights view. The traditionalists believe that there is a core, inherent meaning in the concept of property, while the bundle of rights view states that the property owner only has bundle of permissible uses over the property. The two views exist on a spectrum and the difference may be a matter of focus and emphasis.

William Blackstone, in his Commentaries on the Laws of England, wrote that the essential core of property is the right to exclude. That is, the owner of property must be able to exclude others from the thing in question, even though the right to exclude is subject to limitations. By implication, the owner can use the thing, unless another restriction, such as zoning law, prevents it. Other traditionalists argue that three main rights define property: the right to exclusion, use and transfer.

An alternative view of property, favored by legal realists, is that property simply denotes a bundle of rights defined by law and social policy. Which rights are included in the bundle known as property rights, and which bundles are preferred to which others, is simply a matter of policy. Therefore, a government can prevent the building of a factory on a piece of land, through zoning law or criminal law, without damaging the concept of property. The "bundle of rights" view was prominent in academia in the 20th century and remains influential today in American law.

== Acquisition of property ==
=== First Possession ===
Under American law, the first possessor of a property generally acquires the property. The first possessor is the first person who intends to assert control over the object and in fact exercises significant control over the object. A seminal case on first possession is Pierson v. Post. Post was a hunter who was chasing a fox through a vacant land, when Pierson, knowing it was being chased by another, killed the fox and took it away. The issue before the court is whether Post exercised enough control over the fox, a wild animal, to become first possessor.

The majority of the court cited the Justinian Code and various jurists, before concluding that possession required certain control. With wild animals, the majority held, only one who can mortally wound or seize the animal can acquire possession, merely giving chase is not sufficient. The dissenting opinion would require only a reasonable prospect of capture, close pursuit in the case would satisfy the rule. The dissent cited jurists as well as the custom among hunters.

The majority and the dissent also differs in their view of the policy implications of the ruling. The majority would prefer a clear rule, easy for all to understand and allowing individuals to settle disputes with that rule. The dissent raises the issue of incentives, arguing that the "reasonable prospect" rule would incentivize hunters to hunt foxes, which are considered pests.

=== Adverse possession ===
Theories of adverse possession are summarized in an article by Thomas W. Merrill.

=== Regulatory takings ===
Regulatory takings in the United States refer to a situation where government regulation limits the use of private property to such a degree that it effectively deprives the owner of economically reasonable use or value, even though the property hasn't been formally expropriated or physically seized. Under the Takings Clause of the Fifth Amendment, private property cannot be taken for public use without just compensation. This clause is incorporated against the states through the Fourteenth Amendment.

== Types of estates ==
=== Estates and future interests ===
Land ownership in American law is highly complex, based on feudal categories inherited from English law. Although feudalism is no longer relevant in the modern United States, the law in most states have not been simplified to reflect modern circumstances. However, new types of land ownership is generally disallowed, under the numerus clausus principle, unless they are introduced by legislation.

In most states, full ownership of land is known as fee simple, fee simple absolute, or fee. Fee simple refers to a present interest in the land, which continues indefinitely into the future. One other type of ownership is the defeasible fee, which is like fee simple, except that it can end upon some event occurring. The defeasible fee is sometimes seen with property donated to charity for a specific use, where the grantor specifies that the ownership may end if the property is no longer used in a certain way.

Another type of present interest is the life estate, by which the grantor gives the life tenant full rights during the life tenant's life. But after his death, the estate will either go back to the grantor (known as a reversion) or to another person (known as a remainder). Remainders can be vested or conditional, based on conditions of the remainder. Remainders are "vested" when the condition of the remainder is fulfilled, even if the possession has not yet been transferred. For example, in a grant "to A for life, then to B if he graduates high school by age 18", the remainder to B vests when B graduates high school by age 18, although the possession will not transfer until A dies. There is also the executory interest, which is a future interest that cuts off a preceding interest when a condition is met.

The focus on vesting is important in many states because contingent remainders (and certain other future interests) are invalidated if they might vest after the period defined by the Rule Against Perpetuities (RAP). The Rule Against Perpetuities traditionally requires an interest to vest "if at all, not later than twenty-one years after some life in being at the creation of the interest." Any future interest not conforming to the Rule Against Perpetuities is traditionally invalid. Many states have reformed the RAP with "wait-and-see statutes" or abolished it all together.

=== Co-ownership ===
Under the common law, real estate can be jointly owned at a given time. In most states, in a tenancy in common, co-tenants each have a theoretical right to possess the whole property. Co-tenants must also share rents received from third-parties, as well as upkeep expenses and taxes. However, if they cannot work out how to divide the use of the property, one co-tenant can prevent another from taking possession, but must be liable to the ousted tenant for the rent.

== See also ==
- Property law
