= Corelative =

Legal philosophy

Correlative ("corelative," UK spelling) is the term adopted by Wesley Newcomb Hohfeld to describe the philosophical relationships between fundamental legal concepts in jurisprudence.

== Hohfeldian analysis ==
Hohfeld was concerned that there was some ambiguity in the explanation of the similarities and differences between concepts in law. Hence, with the focus on the nature of rights, he proposed a system of analysis based on "jural correlatives" and "jural opposites". A correlative is where two concepts are logically consistent and the one necessarily implies the other. When two concepts are Hohfeldian opposites (technically, logical contradictions), they are mutually exclusive.

Thus, if A has a right with regard to B, an analysis of their relationship from B's point of view must imply that B has a duty to A. An owner of land may hold four distinct entitlements: rights, privileges, powers, and immunities. Hohfeld linked each entitlement to a correlative and its opposite:

Elements	Correlatives	Opposites
Right	Duty	No Right
Privilege or Liberty	No Right	Duty
Power	Liability	Disability
Immunity	Disability	Liability

== In practice ==
Jurists such as Mickey Dias and Hohfeld have declared that rights and duties are jural corelatives, which means that if someone has a right, someone else owes a duty to him.

== See also ==
- Civil rights
