= Vasak =

Vasak may refer to:

- Vasak Siwni (died 452), Armenian prince, lord of the principality of Syunik
- Karel Vasak (1929–2015), French diplomat and writer
