= Negative and positive rights =

Rights that oblige either inaction or action

Negative and positive rights are rights that oblige either inaction (negative rights) or action (positive rights). These obligations may be of either a legal or moral character. The notion of positive and negative rights may also be applied to liberty rights.

Negative rights may include civil and political rights such as freedom of speech, life, private property, freedom from violent crime, protection against being defrauded, freedom of religion, habeas corpus, a fair trial, and the right not to be enslaved by another.

Positive rights, as initially proposed in 1979 by the Czech jurist Karel Vašák, may include other civil and political rights such as the right to counsel and police protection of person and property. Additionally, they may include economic, social and cultural rights such as food, housing, public education, employment, national security, military, health care, social security, internet access, and a minimum standard of living. In the "three generations" account of human rights, negative rights are often associated with the first generation of rights, while positive rights are associated with the second and third generations.

Under the theory of positive and negative rights, a negative right is a right not to be subjected to an action of another person or group such as a government, usually occurring in the form of abuse or coercion. Negative rights exist unless someone acts to negate them. A positive right is a right to be subjected to an action of another person or group. In the framework of the Kantian categorical imperative, negative rights can be associated with perfect duties, while positive rights can be connected to imperfect duties.

== Analysis ==
The belief in a distinction between positive and negative rights is generally maintained, or emphasized, by libertarians, who believe that positive rights do not exist until they are created by a contract. The United Nations Universal Declaration of Human Rights lists both positive and negative rights (but does not identify them as such). The constitutions of most liberal democracies guarantee negative rights, but not all include positive rights. Positive rights are often guaranteed by other laws, and the majority of liberal democracies provide their citizens with publicly funded education, health care, social security and unemployment benefits. Some philosophers disagree that the negative–positive rights distinction is useful or valid.

== When negative and positive rights conflict ==
Rights are deemed to be inalienable. However, in practice this is often taken as graded absolutism, as rights are ranked by their degree of importance, and violations of less important rights are accepted in the course of preventing violations of more important ones. Even if the right to not be killed is inalienable, the corresponding obligation on others to refrain from killing generally has at least one exception: self-defense. Certain widely accepted negative obligations (such as the obligations to refrain from theft, murder, etc.) are often considered prima facie, meaning that the legitimacy of the obligation is accepted "on its face"; but even if not questioned, such obligations may still be ranked for ethical analysis. Most modern societies insist that other ethical questions need to come into play before stealing can justify killing. Due to being universally regarded as one of the highest obligations, the obligation not to kill is significantly greater than the obligation not to steal. This is why a breach of the latter does not justify a breach of the former.

Positive obligations confer duty. In ethics, positive obligations are almost never considered prima facie. The greatest negative obligation may have just one exception—one higher obligation of self-defense. However, even the greatest positive obligations generally require more complex ethical analysis. For example, one could easily justify failing to help, not just one, but several injured children quite ethically, in the case of triage after a disaster. This consideration has led ethicists to agree in a general way that positive obligations are usually junior to negative obligations, as they are not reliably prima facie. Some critics of positive rights (such as Ayn Rand) implicitly suggest that because positive obligations are not reliably prima facie, they must always be agreed to through contract.

Nineteenth-century philosopher Frédéric Bastiat summarized the conflict between these negative and positive rights by saying:

M. de Lamartine wrote me one day: "Your doctrine is only the half of my program; you have stopped at liberty; I go on to fraternity." I answered him: "The second half of your program will destroy the first half." And, in fact, it is quite impossible for me to separate the word "fraternity" from the word "voluntary." It is quite impossible for me to conceive of fraternity as legally enforced, without liberty being legally destroyed, and justice being legally trampled underfoot.

Jan Narveson argues that the claim suggesting there is no distinction between negative and positive rights because negative rights require police and courts for enforcement is "mistaken." He says that the question of what one has a right to do and if anybody enforces it is a separate issue. If rights are only negative, then it means that no one has a duty to enforce them, however, individuals have a right to use any non-forcible means to gain the cooperation of others in protecting those rights. He says, "The distinction between negative and positive is quite robust." Libertarians hold that positive rights, which would include a right to be protected, do not exist until they are created by a contract. However, those with this view do not mean that police, for example, are not obligated to protect the rights of citizens. Since they contract with their employers to defend citizens from violence, then they have created that obligation to their employer. A negative right to life may allow an individual to defend his life from others trying to kill him, or obtain voluntary assistance from others to defend his life.

Other advocates of the view that there is a distinction between negative and positive rights argue that the presence of a police force or army is not due to any positive right to these services that citizens claim, but rather because they are natural monopolies or public goods. These are features of any human society that arise naturally, even while adhering to the concept of negative rights only. Robert Nozick discusses this idea at length in his book Anarchy, State, and Utopia.

The Soviet Union criticized the Universal Declaration of Human Rights according to Marxism–Leninism for prioritizing negative rights over positive rights.

=== In medicine ===
In the field of medicine, positive rights of patients often conflict with negative rights of physicians. In controversial areas such as abortion and assisted suicide, medical professionals may not wish to offer certain services for moral or philosophical reasons. If enough practitioners opt out as a result of conscience, a right granted by the conscience clause statutes in many jurisdictions (see Conscientious objection to abortion and Conscience clause in medicine in the United States), patients may not have any means of having their own positive rights fulfilled. This was the case of Janet Murdock, a Montana woman who could not find any physician to assist in her suicide in 2009. This controversy over positive and negative rights in medicine has seen an ongoing public debate between conservative ethicist Wesley J. Smith and bioethicist Jacob M. Appel. In discussing Baxter v. Montana, Appel has written:

Medical licenses are a limited commodity, reflecting an artificial shortage created by a partnership between Congress and organizations representing physicians—with medical school seats and residency positions effectively allotted by the government, much like radio frequencies. Physicians benefit from this arrangement in that a smaller number of physicians inevitably leads to increased rates of reimbursement. There's nothing inherently wrong with this arrangement. However, it belies any claim that doctors should have the same right to choose their customers as barbers or babysitters. Much as the government has been willing to impose duties on radio stations (e.g., indecency codes, equal time rules) that would be impermissible if applied to newspapers, Montana might reasonably consider requiring physicians, in return for the privilege of a medical license, to prescribe medication to the dying without regard to the patient's intent.

Smith replies that this is "taking the duty to die and transforming it into a duty to kill", which he argues "reflects a profound misunderstanding of the government's role".

== Criticism ==
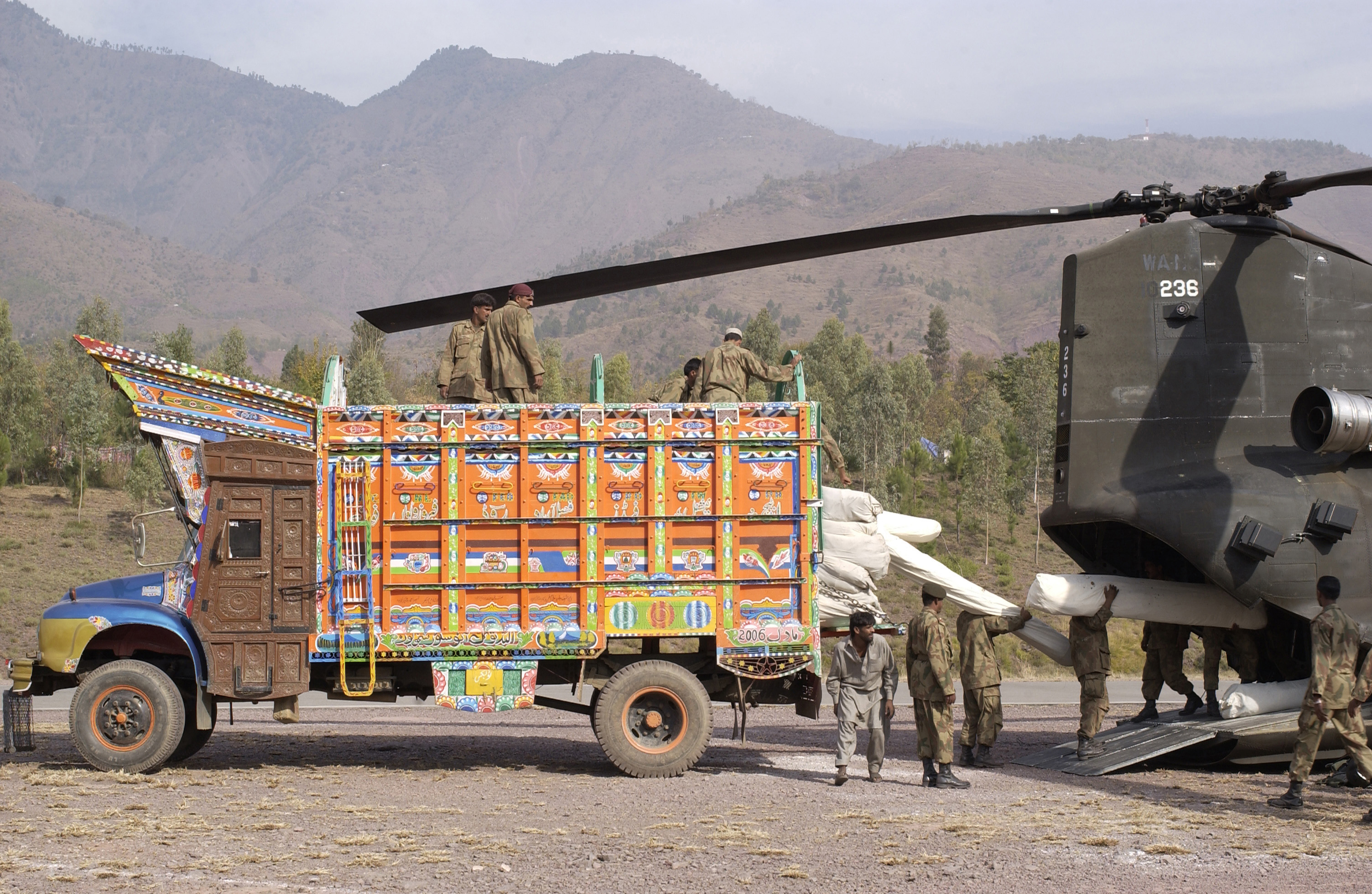
A right to adequate nutrition requires duties to avoid stealing, but also duties to act in ways that protect or repair the delivery of the supplies. The right cannot be guaranteed by only positive duties, nor only negative duties; it needs both.

If an individual has positive rights, it implies that other people have positive duties (to take certain actions); whereas negative rights imply that others have negative duties (to avoid certain other actions). Philosopher Henry Shue believes that all rights (regardless of whether they seem more "negative" or "positive") require both kinds of duties at once. Shue says that honouring a right will require avoidance (a "negative" duty), but also protective or reparative actions ("positive" duties). The negative positive distinction may be a matter of emphasis; so a right will not be described as though it requires only one of the two types of duties.

To Shue, rights can always be understood as confronting "standard threats" against humanity. Dealing with standard threats requires duties, which may be divided across time (e.g., "if avoiding the harmful behavior fails, begin to repair the damages"), but also divided across people. Every right provokes all three types of behavior (avoidance, protection, repair) to some degree. Dealing with a threat like murder, for instance, will require one individual to practice avoidance (e.g., the potential murderer must stay calm), others to protect (e.g., the police officer, who must stop the attack, or the bystander, who may be obligated to call the police), and others to repair (e.g., the doctor who must resuscitate a person who has been attacked). He implies that even the negative right not to be killed can only be guaranteed with the help of some positive duties. Shue further maintains that the negative and positive rights distinction can be harmful because it may result in the neglect of necessary duties.

James P. Sterba makes similar criticisms. He holds that any right can be made to appear either positive or negative depending on the language used to define it. He writes:

What is at stake is the liberty of the poor not to be interfered with in taking from the surplus possessions of the rich [emphasis added] what is necessary to satisfy their basic needs. Needless to say, libertarians would want to deny that the poor have this liberty. But how could they justify such a denial? As this liberty of the poor has been specified, it is not a positive right to receive something, but a negative right of non-interference.

[Citation needed]

Sterba has rephrased the traditional "positive right" to provisions, and put it in the form of a sort of "negative right" not to be prevented from taking the resources on their own. All rights may not only require both "positive" and "negative" duties, but rights that do not involve forced labor may be phrased positively or negatively at will.[Citation needed]

== See also ==
- Claim rights and liberty rights – A different distinction, orthogonal to that between positive and negative rights
- Constitutional economics – Research program in economics and constitutionalism
- Constitutionalism – Belief that government authority derives from fundamental law
- Freedom versus license – Distinction in moral and legal philosophy
- Rule according to higher law – Belief that universal principles of morality override unjust laws
- Second Bill of Rights – Proposed legislation in the US
- Three generations of human rights – Division of human rights into three chronological categories
- Two Concepts of Liberty – A lecture by Isaiah Berlin, which distinguished between positive and negative liberty
- Vienna Declaration and Programme of Action – Human rights declaration
