= Samuel Moyn =

American historian (born 1972)

Sam Moyn
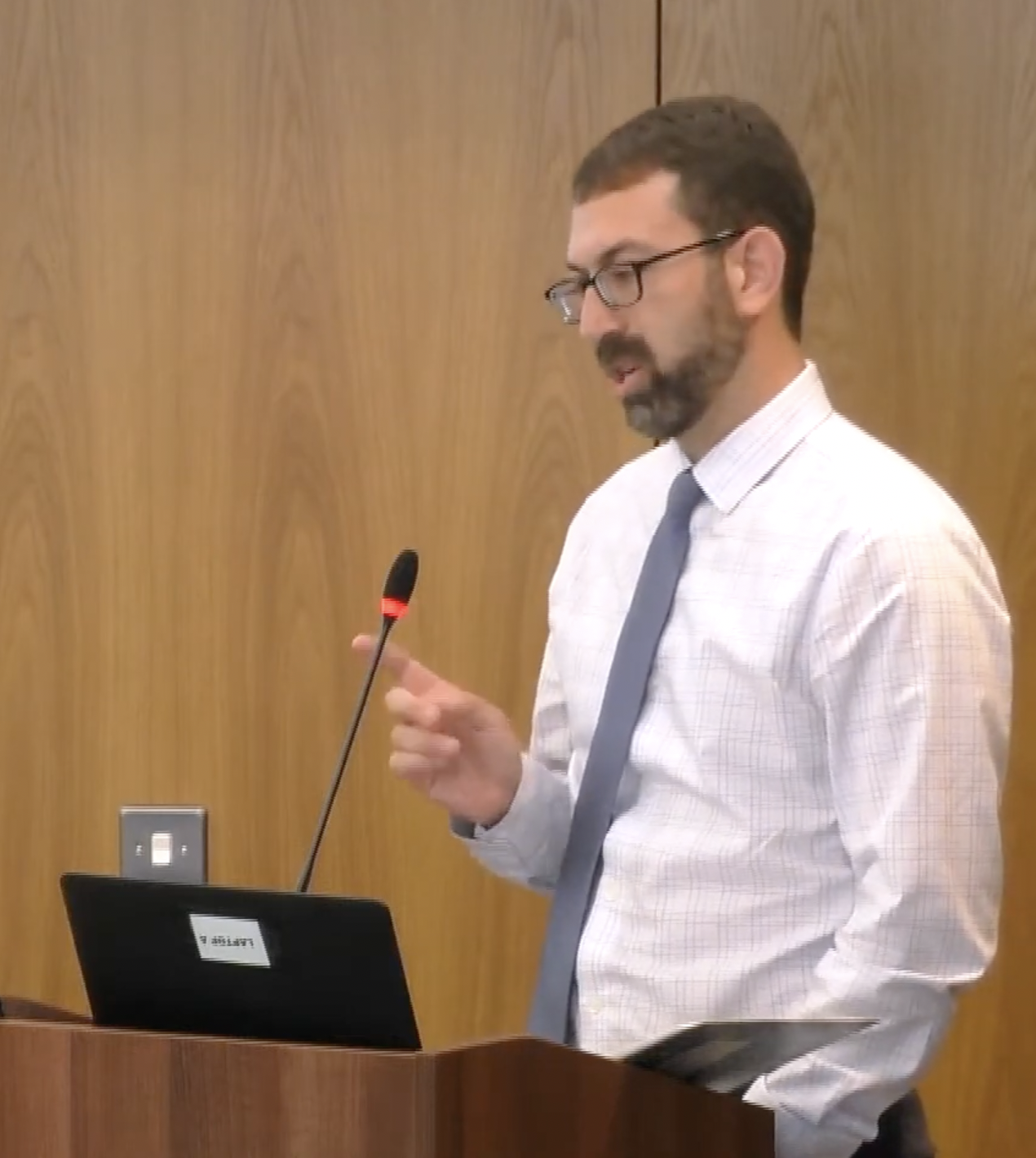
- Moyn in 2018
- Born: Samuel Aaron Moyn; 1972 (age 53–54)

Academic background
- Education: Washington University (BA); University of California, Berkeley (PhD); Harvard University (JD)

Academic work
- Discipline: Historian
- Sub-discipline: Intellectual history Political theory Legal history
- Institutions: Columbia University; Harvard Law School; Yale University
- Website: Official website

Samuel Aaron Moyn (born 1972) is the Chancellor Kent Professor of Law and History at Yale University, previously the Henry R. Luce Professor of Jurisprudence at Yale Law School and professor of history at Yale University, which he joined in July 2017.

He was a professor of history at Columbia University for thirteen years and a professor of history and of law at Harvard University for three years.

His research interests are in modern European intellectual history, and has published on both the history of international law and human rights, and legal theory concerning constitutionalism and democracy.

== Academic career ==
Samuel Moyn at a conference with New America

After attending University City High School in St. Louis, Missouri, Moyn earned his A.B. degree from Washington University in St. Louis in history and French literature (1994). He continued his education, earning a Ph.D. from the University of California at Berkeley (2000) and his J.D. from Harvard Law School (2001).

In 2007, Moyn received Columbia University's Mark Van Doren Award and its Distinguished Columbia Faculty Award for "unusual merit across a range of professorial activities".

He is also a fellow at the Quincy Institute for Responsible Statecraft.

He was appointed head of Grace Hopper College at Yale in 2024.

== Personal life ==
Moyn was married to Alisa Annah Berger in 2003. His parents are Anita Hutkin of St. Louis and John Moyn of Newark, Delaware. Moyn is Jewish.

== Publications ==
=== Books ===
- Origins of the Other: Emmanuel Levinas between Revelation and Ethics (2005, Cornell University Press)
- A Holocaust Controversy: The Treblinka Affair in Postwar France (2005, Brandeis University Press)
- Pierre Rosanvallon, Democracy Past and Future (2006, editor Samuel Moyn, Columbia University Press)
- The Last Utopia: Human Rights in History (2010, Harvard University Press)
- Human Rights and the Uses of History (2014, Verso Books)
- Christian Human Rights (2015, University of Pennsylvania Press)
- Not Enough: Human Rights in an Unequal World (2018, Harvard University Press)
- Humane: How the United States Abandoned Peace and Reinvented War (2021, Macmillan)
- Liberalism Against Itself: Cold War Intellectuals and the Making of Our Times (2023, Yale University Press)
- Gerontocracy in America: How the Old Are Hoarding Power and Wealth―and What to Do About It (2026, Farrar, Straus and Giroux)

=== Articles ===
- "Imperial Graveyard" (review of George Packer, Our Man: Richard Holbrooke and the End of the American Century, Cape, 2019, 592 pp., ISBN 978 1 910702 92 5), London Review of Books, vol. 42, no. 3 (6 February 2020), pp. 23–25.
- "The Road to Hell" (review of Samantha Power's The Education of an Idealist: A Memoir), American Affairs Journal Vol. IV, Spring 2020 pp. 149–160.
- "Michael Ratner's Tragedy, and Ours" (essay adapted by the author from his 2021 book Humane: How the United States Abandoned Peace and Reinvented War), The New York Review of Books, September 1, 2021.
- "Older Americans Are Hoarding America’s Potential" (guest essay), The New York Times, April 21, 2026.
