= Michael Dias =

British barrister and academic

Mickey Dias
- Born: Reginald Walter Michael Dias Bandaranaike; 3 March 1921; Colombo, Ceylon
- Died: 17 November 2009 (aged 88)
- Education: Trinity Hall, Cambridge
- Occupations: Legal scholar, researcher and teacher
- Known for: Author of leading works on jurisprudence and the law of tort

Reginald Walter Michael "Mickey" Dias Bandaranaike QC (3 March 1921 – 17 November 2009) was a barrister, academic and author of leading works on jurisprudence and the law of tort. He was the first Law Fellow of Magdalene College, Cambridge, Director of Studies and Professor of Jurisprudence.

== Early life and education ==
Born in Colombo, Ceylon (now Sri Lanka) on 3 March 1921 to the Dias family which had strong connections to the law. His father was Felix Reginald Dias Bandaranaike II, puisne justice, and his mother was "Princess" Joy De Livera. The Dias family included Sir Harry Dias Bandaranaike, judge of the Supreme Court and acting chief justice, Felix Reginald Dias Bandaranaike I (grandfather), judge of the Supreme Court. His half brother was Felix Dias Bandaranaike who later served as the minister of justice and minister of finance of Ceylon.

Dias was educated at Royal Preparatory School and later at Royal College Colombo. He attended the Ceylon Law College and in 1939, entered Trinity Hall, University of Cambridge, like his father and grandfather before him. At Cambridge he took a starred first class in all three years of the Law Tripos, another in the LLB in 1943, and won the George Long Prizes for Jurisprudence and Roman Law. During this time he represented the university against Oxford at tennis in all four years winning a blue in tennis.

== War service ==
While at Cambridge, Dias served in the Home Guard and after graduating he joined the Royal Air Force, where he was served in the Coastal Command as a tail gunner flying in bombers equipped with Leigh Lights and played tennis at Wimbledon for the RAF.

== Career ==
Whilst serving in the RAF, he passed the exams and was called to the Bar in 1944 at the Inner Temple. Following demobilisation, he returned to Cambridge, where he supervised in Law for Trinity Hall and later served as a lecturer at University College Wales, Aberystwyth (1949–51) before returning to Cambridge in 1951 as a lecturer in law at Trinity Hall. He continued to work from Trinity Hall until elected by Magdalene College, Cambridge, as their first Law Fellow in 1955 going on to hold office as president from 1988 to 1991 and serving as secretary to the Faculty Board of Law, as a member of the General Board and the Council of the Senate, and as Senior Proctor 1987–88. He was elected an honorary bencher of the Inner Temple in 1992 and appointed an honorary silk as a Queen's Counsel in 2002.

=== Legal scholarship ===
His research was mainly in the fields of Roman law, jurisprudence and the law of tort. He is best known for his work Dias on Jurisprudence, his work as editor (from 1961) and, subsequently, general editor (from 1975 to 1995) of the leading practitioners' work Clerk and Lindsell on Torts.

A particular concept favoured by Dias was Hohfeld's analysis of "jural corelatives" and "jural opposites"; namely that, for instance, rights and duties were corelatives (and not opposites).

| Elements | Correlatives | Opposites |
| Right | Duty | No Right |
| Privilege or Liberty | No Right | Duty |
| Power | Liability | Disability |
| Immunity | Disability | Liability |

== Family ==
He met Norah Hunter Crabb, then serving in the WAAF, whom he married in 1947. Norah died in an aircraft accident in 1980. They had a daughter Julia Dias who graduated from Cambridge attending Trinity Hall and was later appointed QC.
