= Claim rights and liberty rights =

Distinction between rights entailing or not entailing obligations

Some philosophers and political scientists make a distinction between claim rights and liberty rights. A claim right is a right which entails responsibilities, duties, or obligations on other parties regarding the right-holder. In contrast, a liberty right is a right which does not entail obligations on other parties, but rather only freedom or permission for the right-holder. In other words, a person's liberty right to x consists in his freedom to do or have x, while a person's claim right to x consists in an obligation on others to allow or enable him to do or have x.

The distinction between these two senses of "rights" originates in American jurist Wesley Newcomb Hohfeld's analysis thereof in his seminal work Fundamental Legal Conceptions, As Applied in Judicial Reasoning and Other Legal Essays (1919).

Liberty rights and claim rights are the inverse of one another: a person has a liberty right permitting him to do something only if there is no other person who has a claim right forbidding him from doing so; and likewise, if a person has a claim right against someone else, that other person's liberty is thus limited. This is because the deontic concepts of obligation and permission are De Morgan dual; a person is permitted to do all and only the things he is not obliged to refrain from, and obliged to do all and only the things he is not permitted to refrain from.

== Second-order rights ==
Hohfeld's original analysis included two other types of right: besides claims (or rights proper) and liberties (or privileges), he wrote of powers, and immunities. The other two terms of Hohfeld's analysis, powers and immunities, refer to second-order liberties and claims, respectively. Powers are liberty rights regarding the modification of first-order rights. Immunities, conversely, are claim rights regarding the modification of first-order rights.

== See also ==
- Constitutional economics – Research program in economics and constitutionalism
- Constitutionalism – Belief that government authority derives from fundamental law
- Freedom versus license – Distinction in moral and legal philosophy
- Negative and positive rights – Rights that oblige either inaction or action
- Rule according to higher law – Belief that universal principles of morality override unjust laws
- Wesley Newcomb Hohfeld – American jurist (1879–1918)
