= Julia Dias =

British High Court judge (born 1959)

The Honourable Mrs Justice Dias DBE, KC
- Royal coat of arms of the United Kingdom

Justice of the High Court
- Incumbent
- Assumed office 20 March 2023
- Appointed by: Charles III

Personal details
- Born: 31 January 1959 (age 67) Cambridge, Cambridgeshire, England
- Education: Trinity Hall

Dame Julia Amanda Dias DBE, KC (born 31 January 1959) is a British High Court judge.

== Personal life ==
Dias was born in Cambridge on 31 January 1959, the daughter of Michael Dias and Norah Dias. She attended Perse School for Girls in Cambridge, later studying at Trinity Hall, Cambridge, graduating in 1981. Dias married in 1983 and has one son and one daughter. She is fluent in French and Russian.

== Career ==
Dias was called to the Bar in 1982 by Inner Temple, spending her early years in law as an Assistante Associée at the Paris Institute of Comparative Law.

Dias joined the London-based chambers 7KBW in 1985 as the first female tenant, working in specialist commercial practice. She was called to the Gibraltar Bar in 1994.

She took silk in 2008, granting her the title QC (now KC since 8 September 2022).

She was appointed a Deputy High Court Judge in 2018 assigned to the Chancery division and High Court judge on 20 March 2023, assigned to the King's Bench Division by the Lord Chief Justice of England and Wales.

Dias received the customary damehood in 2023.
