= Infectious invalidity =

Infectious invalidity is a doctrine of property law that provides that under certain defined circumstances because one action is improper another action is invalid. If applicable, the failure of certain transfers may cause interests that are otherwise valid to fail also. This approach was taken in the Massachusetts case of New England Trust Co. v. Sanger, 337 Mass. 342, 149 N.E.2d 598 (1958).

The Restatement (2d) of Property, which is a treatise describing general legal principles applied by the courts in the United States states that

Infectious invalidity means that the failure of certain transfers may cause interests that are otherwise valid to fail also. This approach was taken in New England Trust Co. v. Sanger, 337 Mass. 342, 149 N.E.2d 598 (1958). A trust provided for income to be paid to the surviving children of the settlor's brother for life, and on the death of the last surviving child of the settlor's brother, an equal division of the trust principle was to be made among the issue of the children of the settlor's brother. The gift to the issue of the brother's children failed, because the ascertainment of issue could not be made until the brother's children died, and the brother might have children born after the creation of the trust who might not die within the permissible period. However, a later trust had been established by the settlor, which stated that if any provision in the first trust indenture should be declared invalid, any income or principal which reverted to his estate should be deemed held in trust by the settlor for the benefit of his brother's children and their issue. Applying the doctrine of infectious invalidity to avoid a distortion of the settlor's "clear desire," the court held that the second trust should govern the trust distribution. It stated that by striking down all the gifts, valid and invalid, made in the first trust, and by giving effect to the second trust, the settlor's plan for the income gifts was substantially carried out. [§ 1.5 comment 7]

In zoning law, infectious invalidity is a principle where a parcel of land that itself complies with zoning requirements is considered to be in violation of zoning laws because of the circumstances of its creation. The situation arises when a parcel of land is improperly divided into two lots, resulting in one of the new lot conforming to the applicable zoning standards and one lot not conforming. The legal principle is applied resulting in the conforming lot being deemed to be infected because of the illegal condition created on the other lot and the creation of the two lots is deemed invalid. Infectious invalidity affects both zoning and property ownership rights.
