= Wesley Newcomb Hohfeld =

American jurist (1879–1918)

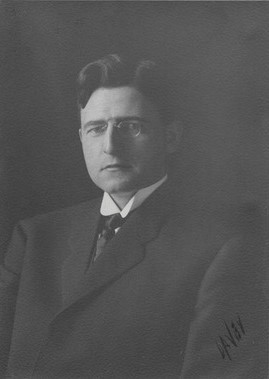
- Born: August 9, 1879; Oakland, California
- Died: October 21, 1918 (aged 39)
- Education: University of California, Berkeley; Harvard Law School (LLB)

Wesley Newcomb Hohfeld (August 9, 1879 – October 21, 1918) was an American legal scholar who wrote about jurisprudence and the nature of rights.

Hohfeld graduated first in his class from the University of California, Berkeley in 1901, before studying law at Harvard Law School, where he was editor of the Harvard Law Review, graduating in 1904.

During his brief life, he published only a handful of law review articles. After his death, his opus book, Fundamental Legal Conceptions as Applied in Judicial Reasoning and Other Legal Essays, was published based on two articles in the Yale Law Journal in 1913 and 1917 as well as manuscript notes and seven other essays. The work became a powerful contribution to modern understanding of the nature of rights and the implications of liberty.

A professorship at Yale University is named after him. The chair is occupied by Gideon Yaffe as of 2026 and had previously been held by Jules Coleman and Ronald Dworkin. He is often regarded as the progenitor of the "bundle of rights" theory.

== Early life, education, and legal practice ==
Wesley Newcomb Hohfeld was born in Oakland, California, in 1879. He graduated first in his class from the University of California, Berkeley, in 1901, and was elected to Phi Beta Kappa. He went on to Harvard Law School, where he served as editor of the Harvard Law Review, and graduated in 1904.

After returning to California after graduation, Hohfeld practiced law for one year with the San Francisco law firm of Morrison, Cope & Brobeck, the distant ancestor of two large law firms: Morrison & Foerster (still in business today), and Brobeck, Phleger & Harrison (which collapsed in 2003). After Alexander Morrison died in 1921, Hohfeld's brother Edward obtained the permission of Morrison's widow, May Treat Morrison, to use the Morrison name for his new law firm: Morrison, Hohfeld, Foerster, Shuman and Clark.

== Academic career ==
Hohfeld briefly taught as an instructor at the law school then called the Hastings College of the Law. He then joined the faculty of Stanford Law School, where he became a full-time professor and taught from 1905 to 1914. He also continued to work as a consultant to the Morrison firm on various matters, such as the division of Claus Spreckels's estate.

In 1913, the Yale Law Journal published Hohfeld's landmark article, "Some Fundamental Legal Conceptions as Applied in Judicial Reasoning". According to Arthur Corbin, Yale Law School offered Hohfeld a professorship on the basis of that article. Hohfeld applied his own ideas about "rights" and "privileges" to the deal he struck with Yale and Stanford: after one academic year, he would have the "right" to a permanent faculty appointment at Yale and the "privilege" of returning to Stanford, while Stanford agreed to grant him the "privilege" of leave for one year or longer, with the "right" to return to Stanford after one academic year.

When Hohfeld started teaching at Yale in 1914, many of his students signed a petition to Yale's president to send him back to Stanford. They were terrified he would flunk them for their inability to master his strange ideas. When the president told Hohfeld to take it easy on his students, Corbin had to play mediator, calm down a frustrated Hohfeld, and explain to the president the deal which Hohfeld had worked out between the two law schools. Hohfeld then exercised his right to stay at Yale, apparently because he believed Yale students would come around, like his former Stanford students who had already begun to express their gratitude for the utility of his ideas. In 1917, he published another article expanding on his 1913 work.

He continued to teach at Yale until his death in 1918. In 1919, a book collecting his articles, essays, and manuscript was published posthumously in his name.

== Death and legacy ==
He died on October 21, 1918, in Alameda, California, of endocarditis induced by a severe infection during the 1918 flu pandemic. The Yale Law Journal published a commemorative issue in his memory.

In 1958, Edward Hohfeld, as trustee of the May Treat Morrison Foundation, endowed a chair at Yale in his late brother's memory. Holders include Gideon Yaffe, Jules Coleman, and Ronald Dworkin.

=== Academic and legal impact ===
Hohfeld's major contribution was a precise analysis of rights which distinguished between fundamental legal concepts and identified the framework of legal relationships between them. His work offers a method of deconstructing broad legal principles into their component elements and identifies the policy implications and issues that arise in practical decision making.

Hohfeld is also credited as the progenitor of the concept of the bundle of rights, although Hohfeld himself never used the term. The American Law Institute's first Reporter of Property, Harry Bigelow, "fully assimilated and embraced" Hohfeld's view of property rights, and propagated them to a wider audience in the form of the first Restatement of Property. This, however, made the Restatement unpopular among lawyers and scholars, leading it to become less influential than the Restatements of Contract and Tort.

In general jurisprudence, he is regarded as a major figure associated with legal realism.

Outside of American jurisprudence, supporters of Hohfeld's theory include Mickey Dias and Robert Alexy.

== Theory of rights ==
Hohfeld's theory of rights identified eight kinds of distinct concepts that are referred to when judges use the term "right", criticising judicial usage, such as in Quinn v Leathem, as conceptually inaccurate and flawed. Hohfeld instead defined the concepts relative to one another by grouping them into four pairs of jural opposites and four pairs of jural correlatives.

=== Hohfeldian incidents ===
According to Hohfeld, a claim right, or "right" for short, is a right that entails obligations by other parties to the right-holder. In contrast, a liberty right, or "privilege", is a right that entails not obligations upon other parties but only permissions for the right-holder. Applying the language of propositional logic, the deontic concepts of obligation and permission may be described as De Morgan dual.

Hohfeld also identified "powers" as liberties that can change the legal relations of someone else and "immunities" as claim rights against other people from changing their own legal rights. For example, a person with "power" over another may be able to alter the claims, liberties, and even powers and immunities, that the second person is entitled to. H. L. A. Hart described "powers" and "liberties" as constituting the "secondary rules" of law within his Concept of Law, legal rules which are able to modify primary legal rules.

These four rights are known as the Hohfeldian incidents.

=== Jural opposites and correlatives ===
Jural opposites
| (1) | (2) | (3) | (4) |
| Right/claim-right | Privilege/liberty-right | Power | Immunity |
| No-right | Duty | Disability | Liability |

Jural correlatives
| (1) | (2) | (3) | (4) |
| Right/claim-right | Privilege/liberty-right | Power | Immunity |
| Duty | No-right | Liability | Disability |

In Hohfeldian terms, correlative "rights" can and must always be matched against one another. For example, a right holder can only exist if another person owes a duty to honor the right:

$A \xrightarrow{\text{right}} B \iff B \xrightarrow{\text{duty}} A$

According to Hohfeld, the "jural opposite" of the "right" is the "no-right", and the opposite of the "duty" is the "privilege" or "liberty-right":

$A \xrightarrow{\text{right}} B \iff \neg (A \xrightarrow{\text{no-right}} B)$

$B \xrightarrow{\text{duty}} A \iff \neg (B \xrightarrow{\text{liberty}} A)$

This means that where one has no duty to refrain from doing something, they have a privilege, and where one has no claim-right against another, they have a no-right. For example, in contract law, if a plaintiff has failed to mitigate damages, the defendant gains a privilege not to pay those additional damages, and the plaintiff correspondingly has no claim-right to such damages.

$A \xrightarrow{\text{liberty}} B \iff B \xrightarrow{\text{no-right}} A \iff \neg (A \xrightarrow{\text{duty}} B) \iff \neg (B \xrightarrow{\text{right}} A)$

=== Property rights ===
Because all rights, according to Hohfeld, are defined as between two individuals, there can be no such thing as a right to property in the sense of there being a legal relation between a person and property. Rather, Hohfeld conceptualises personal rights or rights in personam as "paucital" (i.e. existing directly between two persons) and property rights or rights in rem as an "aggregate of multital rights" (i.e. existing between a large, indefinite class of people, enforceable against the whole world).

The Hohfeldian theory of property rights has sometimes been described as the "bundle of rights" theory, although Hohfeld did not use the term. Before it was developed, the idea of property was commonly seen in terms of dominion over a thing, as in the ability of the owner to place restrictions on others from interfering with the owner's property. The "bundle of rights" is now a popular pedagogical metaphor, particularly in American law schools, to describe "full" property ownership as a partition of various entitlements of different stakeholders. Another popular metaphor is that of the "bundle of sticks".

== Bibliography ==
- Hohfeld, Wesley. Fundamental Legal Conceptions. Arthur Corbin, ed. (Westport, Conn., Greenwood Press (1978)
- Hohfeld, Wesley. "Some Fundamental Legal Conceptions as Applied in Legal Reasoning," 23 Yale Law Journal 16 (1913).

== See also ==
- Analytical jurisprudence
- Civil rights
- Claim rights and liberty rights
- Private property
- Property
