= Freedom versus license =

Distinction in moral and legal philosophy

In moral and legal philosophy, there exists a distinction between the concepts of freedom and license. The former deals with the rights of the individual; the latter covers the expressed permission (or lack thereof) for more than one individual to engage in an activity.

As a result, freedoms usually include rights which are usually recognized (often, not always, in an unconditional manner) by the government (and access to which is theoretically enforced against any and all interferences). Licenses, on the other hand, are distributed to individuals who make use of a specific item, expressing the permission to use the item or service under specified, conditional terms and boundaries of usage.

== Related topics ==
- Claim rights and liberty rights
- Negative and positive rights
