= Jules Coleman =

American legal scholar

Jules Leslie Coleman
- Born: 1947 (age 78–79)
- Title: Wesley Newcomb Hohfeld Professor of Jurisprudence; Professor of Philosophy; Senior Vice Provost for Academic Planning; Chief Academic Officer
- Awards: Guggenheim Fellowship (1988); Brooklyn College Distinguished Alumni Award (1988)

Academic background
- Education: Brooklyn College (B.A., 1968); Rockefeller University (Ph.D., 1972); Yale Law School (M.S.L., 1976)

Academic work
- Discipline: Law, jurisprudence, philosophy

Jules Leslie Coleman (born 1947) is a scholar of law and jurisprudence. He was the Wesley Newcomb Hohfeld Professor of Jurisprudence and Professor of Philosophy at Yale Law School until 2012. Coleman is chief academic officer at MYX, a hybrid approach to higher education with campuses starting fall 2021. Before joining MYX, he was the Senior Vice Provost for Academic Planning at New York University.

== Biography ==
Coleman received his B.A. from Brooklyn College of CUNY in 1968, his Ph.D. in Philosophy from Rockefeller University in 1972, and his M.S.L. from the Yale Law School in 1976. He taught classes at Yale on philosophy of law; torts; law, language and truth; political philosophy; and rational choice. Coleman briefly served on the faculty of the University of California at Berkeley and returned there again later in his career to teach philosophy in the Jurisprudence and Social Policy program. In 1988, he received the Brooklyn College Distinguished Alumni Award and was granted a Guggenheim Fellowship. He was selected to deliver the Clarendon Lectures at the University of Oxford.

Coleman has published occasionally on the subject of music and sound systems.

Coleman's brother is the fiction writer Reed Farrel Coleman.

== Works ==
Jules Coleman has published extensively in legal journals and is the author of several books. His works include:

- Philosophy of Law: An Introduction to Jurisprudence (with Jeffrey Murphy), 1984
- Markets, Morals, and the Law, 1998 Oxford University Press
- Risks and Wrongs, 1992, Cambridge University Press
- The Practice of Principle: In Defense of a Pragmatist Approach to Legal Theory, 2000, Oxford University Press
- Hart's Postscript: Essays on the Postscript to The Concept of Law, 2001, Oxford University Press
- The Clarendon Lectures in Law, 2001, Oxford University Press
- The Oxford Handbook of Jurisprudence and Legal Philosophy (with Scott Shapiro), 2002, Oxford University Press
- Philosophy and Law (with Joel Feinberg), 2006

Coleman is best known for his espousal of legal positivism.
