= Three generations of human rights =

Division of human rights into three chronological categories

The division of human rights into three generations was initially proposed in 1979 by the Czech jurist Karel Vasak at the International Institute of Human Rights in Strasbourg. He used the term at least as early as November 1977. Vasak's theories have primarily taken root in European law.

In a speech two years later, his divisions follow the three watchwords of the French Revolution: Liberty, Equality, Fraternity. The three generations are reflected in some of the rubrics of the Charter of Fundamental Rights of the European Union. While the Universal Declaration of Human Rights lists first- and second-generation rights, the document itself does not specifically order them in accordance with Vasak's framework.

== First-generation human rights ==
First-generation human rights, sometimes called "blue rights", deal essentially with liberty and participation in political life. They are fundamentally civil and political in nature. They serve negatively to protect the individual from excesses of the state. First-generation rights include, among other things, the right to life, equality before the law, freedom of speech, freedom of religion, property rights, the right to a fair trial, and voting rights. Some of these rights and the right to due process date back to the Magna Carta of 1215 and the Rights of Englishmen, which were expressed in the English Bill of Rights in 1689. A more full set of first-generation human rights was pioneered in France by the Declaration of the Rights of Man and of the Citizen in 1789, and by the United States Bill of Rights in 1791.

They were enshrined at the global level and given status in international law first by Articles 3 to 21 of the 1948 Universal Declaration of Human Rights and later in the 1966 International Covenant on Civil and Political Rights. In Europe, they were enshrined in the European Convention on Human Rights in 1953.

== Second-generation human rights ==
Second-generation human rights are related to equality and began to be recognized by governments after World War II. They are fundamentally economic, social, and cultural in nature. They guarantee different members of the citizenry equal conditions and treatment. Secondary rights would include a right to be employed in just and favorable condition, rights to food, housing and health care, as well as social security and unemployment benefits. Like first-generation rights, they were also covered by the Universal Declaration of Human Rights, and further embodied in Articles 22 to 28 of the Universal Declaration, and the International Covenant on Economic, Social, and Cultural Rights.

In the United States of America, President Franklin D. Roosevelt proposed a Second Bill of Rights, covering much the same grounds, during his State of the Union Address on January 11, 1944. Today, many nations, states, or groups of nations have developed legally binding declarations guaranteeing comprehensive sets of human rights, e.g. the European Social Charter.

Some U.S. states have enacted some of these economic rights; for example, the state of New York has enshrined the right to a free education, as well as "the right to organize and to bargain collectively", and workers' compensation, in its constitutional law.

These rights are sometimes referred to as "red" rights. They impose upon the government the duty to respect and promote and fulfill them, but this depends on the availability of resources. The duty is imposed on the state because it controls its own resources. No one has the direct right to housing and right to education. (In South Africa, for instance, the right is not, per se, to housing, but rather "to have access to adequate housing", realised on a progressive basis.)

The duty of government is in the realization of these positive rights.

== Third-generation human rights ==
Third-generation human rights are those rights that go beyond the mere civil and social, as expressed in many progressive documents of international law, including the 1972 Stockholm Declaration of the United Nations Conference on the Human Environment, the 1992 Rio Declaration on Environment and Development, and other pieces of generally aspirational "soft law".

Also known as Solidarity rights, they are rights that try to go beyond the framework of individual rights to focus on collective concepts, such as community or people. However, the term remains largely unofficial, just as the also-used moniker of "green" rights, and thus houses an extremely broad spectrum of rights, including:

- Group and collective rights
- Right to self-determination
- Right to economic and social development
- Right to a healthy environment
- Right to natural resources
- Right to communicate and communication rights
- Right to participation in cultural heritage
- Rights to intergenerational equity and sustainability

The African Charter on Human and Peoples' Rights ensures many of those: the right to self-determination, right to development, right to natural resources and right to satisfactory environment. Some countries also have constitutional mechanisms for safeguarding third-generation rights. For example, the Hungarian Parliamentary Commissioner for Future Generations, the Parliament of Finland's Committee for the Future, and the erstwhile Commission for Future Generations in the Israeli Knesset.

Some international organizations have offices for safeguarding such rights. An example is the High Commissioner on National Minorities of the Organization for Security and Co-operation in Europe. The Directorate-General for the Environment of the European Commission has as its mission "protecting, preserving and improving the environment for present and future generations, and promoting sustainable development."

A few jurisdictions have enacted provisions for environmental protection, e.g. New York's "forever wild" constitutional article, which is enforceable by action of the New York State Attorney General or by any citizen ex rel. with the consent of the Appellate Division. Wales has legislation to promote sustainable development and establishes a Future Generations Commissioner.

== Fourth generation ==
Several analysts claim that a fourth generation of human rights is emerging, which would include rights that cannot be included in the third generation, future claims of first and second generation rights and new rights, especially in relation to technological development and information and communication technologies and cyberspace.

However, the content of it is not clear, and these analysts do not present a unique proposal. They normally take some rights from the third generation and include them in the fourth, such as the right to a healthy environment or aspects related to bioethics. Some of those analysts believe that the fourth generation is given by human rights in relation to new technologies, while others prefer to talk about digital rights, where a new range of rights would be found, such as:

- The right to equally access computing and digital
- The right to digital self-determination
- The right to digital security
- The right to access one's own digital data (habeas data)

Others point out that the differentiating element would be that, while the first three generations refer to the human being as a member of society, the rights of the fourth would refer to the human being as a species.

== Commentary ==
Maurice Cranston argued that scarcity means that supposed second-generation and third-generation rights are not really rights at all. If one person has a right, others have a duty to respect that right, but governments lack the resources necessary to fulfill the duties implied by citizens' supposed second- and third-generation rights.

Charles Kesler, a professor of government at Claremont McKenna College and senior fellow of the Claremont Institute, has argued that second- and third-generation human rights serve as an attempt to cloak political goals, which the majority may well agree are good things in and of themselves, in the language of rights, and thus grant those political goals inappropriate connotations. In his opinion, calling socio-economic goods "rights" inherently creates a related concept of "duties", so that other citizens have to be coerced by the government to give things to other people in order to fulfill these new rights. He also has stated that, in the U.S., the new rights create a "nationalization" of political decision-making at the federal level in violation of federalism. In his book Soft Despotism, Democracy's Drift, Paul Rahe, professor at Hillsdale College, wrote that focusing on equality-based rights leads to a subordination of the initial civil rights to an ever-expanding government, which would be too incompetent to provide for its citizens correctly and would merely seek to subordinate more rights.

19th century philosopher Frederic Bastiat summarized the conflict between these negative and positive rights by saying:

M. de Lamartine wrote me one day: "Your doctrine is only the half of my program; you have stopped at liberty; I go on to fraternity." I answered him: "The second half of your program will destroy the first half." And, in fact, it is quite impossible for me to separate the word "fraternity" from the word "voluntary". It is quite impossible for me to conceive of fraternity as legally enforced, without liberty being legally destroyed, and justice being legally trampled underfoot.

Economist Friedrich Hayek has argued that the second generation concept of "social justice" cannot have any practical political meaning:

No state of affairs as such is just or unjust: it is only when we assume that somebody is responsible for having brought it about ... In the same sense, a spontaneously working market, where prices act as guides to action, cannot take account of what people in any sense need or deserve, because it creates a distribution which nobody has designed, and something which has not been designed, a mere state of affairs as such, cannot be just or unjust. And the idea that things ought to be designed in a "just" manner means, in effect, that we must abandon the market and turn to a planned economy in which somebody decides how much each ought to have, and that means, of course, that we can only have it at the price of the complete abolition of personal liberty.

New York University School of Law professor of law Jeremy Waldron has written in response to critics of the second-generation rights:

In any case, the argument from first-generation to second-generation rights was never supposed to be a matter of conceptual analysis. It was rather this: if one is really concerned to secure civil or political liberty for a person, that commitment should be accompanied by a further concern about the conditions of the person's life that make it possible for him to enjoy and exercise that liberty. Why on earth would it be worth fighting for this person's liberty (say, his liberty to choose between A and B) if he were left in a situation in which the choice between A and B meant nothing to him, or in which his choosing one rather than the other would have no impact on his life?"

Hungarian socialist and political economist Karl Polanyi made the antithetical argument to Hayek in the book The Great Transformation. Polanyi wrote that an uncontrolled free market would lead to repressive economic concentration and then to a co-opting of democratic governance that degrades civil rights.

The World Conference on Human Rights in 1993 opposed the distinction between civil and political rights (negative rights) and economic, social and cultural rights (positive rights) that resulted in the Vienna Declaration and Programme of Action proclaiming that "all human rights are universal, indivisible, interdependent and interrelated".

== See also ==
- Human security
- "Two Concepts of Liberty", a lecture by Isaiah Berlin which distinguished between positive and negative liberty
- Human rights inflation
