= Property law in Ghana =

Property law in Ghana is the area of formal and informal law that governs how citizens can acquire, register, and maintain property. Property in this instance pertains to physical land and its resources. Property can be bought and acquired following statutory or customary laws. Eighty percent of land in Ghana is owned through customary law and the remaining twenty percent is bought and sold through a formal statutory measures.

Property rights in Ghana have evolved from its pre-colonial, colonial, and post-colonial forms to encompass a blend between customary and statutory property laws. Ghana's current property rights system is governed by the Land Bill of 2016 and several regional customary policies.

== History ==
During the colonial era, the British ruled the Gold Coast (which is now considered modern day Ghana) through indirect rule. Under such a system, the chiefs upheld customary law, but did not have resources or power to uphold decisions if they faced opposition from their people, which made chiefs reliant on the British to help enforce their rulings. The chiefs also served as political advisors to the British for policy making in the region, but had no concrete power in the policy production process. This aspect of indirect rule led many chiefs to feed the British false or unfounded information in attempts to sway policy in their favor.

The discovery of gold and minerals in the Gold Coast made the region a hub for investors looking to purchase land. Land quickly became commercialized, driving land prices up in the mid-1800s. Chiefs sold land without regard to legal property laws, often selling the same piece of land to multiple buyers. To combat such behavior, the British proposed the 1897 Land Bill which identified ‘waste lands, forest lands, and mineral lands in the Queen’ which would prevent Africans from claiming ownership of land unless they could provide concrete proof of ownership. Indigenous elites and traditional rulers argued against this bill arguing that the Land Bill could not be legitimate due to the fact there were no 'waste lands' in the Gold Coast because all land was accounted for through customary law. The British responded to this pushback by withdrawing the Lands Bill.

After the withdrawal of the 1897 Lands Bill, chiefs were able to handle private property matters however they wanted, often granting land ownership without uniformity and making the process malleable by “reinventing” the traditional state. Such a reinvention utilized indirect rule, which gave chiefs the right to define and apply property rights. Rulers changed what was understood as traditional institutions of their state by manipulating the functions and capabilities of the state council, rulers, and laws of inheritance. They did this for each property litigation in order to financially gain from each land transaction.

With independence, Kwame Nkrumah completely changed private land ownership by combining the state's power over property rights and assuming all powers of local institutions. His government rejected traditional rulers influence over the administration of local affairs. The Local Courts Act, 1958 (No. 23) outlawed native powers and appointed government magistrates as responsible for settling issues concerning customary law.

== Statutory law ==
Ghana's current property statutory law system is an amalgamation of departments and policies aimed at identifying procedures associated with the acquisition, registration, and ownership of land. Ghana codified laws about land ownership in the constitution of Ghana ratified in 1992.

The constitution identified public land and minerals as "vested in the president on behalf of, and in trust for, the people of Ghana." Public lands are considered any land the government compulsively attained after the ratification of the 1992 Constitution. The practice of compulsively acquiring land was codified first in the State Lands Act, 1962 (Act 125), which allowed the government to acquire land for the purposes of "national interest or other purposes connected." The government's only way to gain land is through compulsory acquisition, so a lot of land is taken from private land owners, causing many issues between the federal government and the private landowners, some of them being insufficient or untimely payments to landowners from the government and minimal communication of the transaction throughout all parties. In addition, Ghana's compulsory acquisition of public land and minerals for government use has long been a controversial practice and has led to many landowners uninterested in taking care of natural resources they own because they know they will have to sell it to the government eventually. The National Land Policy is the first land policy that acknowledges the dysfunction of the government acquisition of private land and how the government fails to complete payments to landowners who are forced to sell their land to the government under compulsory acquisition laws. Policy states that compensation from the government to landowners should be negotiated and agreed upon by the necessary parties. While this policy is law, it is unclear if the government has taken steps to remedy the issues outlined in the policy.

The constitution also names the Land Commission as the department of government created to direct the use of public lands, propose growth strategies and policies to the President and relevant authorities concerning the public lands and minerals, and oversees the implementation of land title registrations procedures.

In 1999 the government established the National Land Policy which created the First Land Administration Project (LAP-1) in 2003, and was designed as a 25-year project intended to "address...the high level of land disputes in the country and cumbersome land administration procedures involving various statutory agencies as well as customary institutions." Later, LAP-2 was established in order to “consolidate and strengthen urban and rural land administration and management systems for the efficient and transparent land service delivery.” LAP-2 was also designed as an interface between land registration and planning, which required the land registrar to ensure that land was on track for planning. LAP-2 is complemented by the Land Use and Spatial Planning Authority, which is in charge of advising the central government on the creation and declaration of planning areas. Under the Ministry of Environment, Science, Technology and Innovation (MESTI), the agency deems land planning areas, which bars any form of construction or demolition in the specified area until development is approved for the area.

The Land Bill of 2016 combines all of Ghana's land laws created within the 1992 constitution and after. It identifies the Lands Commission as the agency responsible for implementing the Land Bill and defines all possible interests (legal relationship) of land as “allodial title, customary law freehold, common law freehold, usufructuary interest, leasehold interest, and customary tenancies.” Allodial interests are considered the highest form of interest one could hold in a property. It gives the most extensive rights to the holder who is normally a chief, family, or clan. The person or persons with an allodial interest in a property is the original owner of that property (within a customary approach). The customary law freehold interest is a legal relationship with a piece of land during an indefinite period which concludes when something or someone interrupts the validity of the landowner's claim to the land. Such an interruption may look like a denial of title of the allodial holder, the land owner dying without successors and subsequently leaving the plot of land without an owner, or the state acquisition of the land.

The Land Bill of 2016 also notably codifies the relationship between customary and statutory procedures in the land registration process, the implementation of electric land conveyances, specifies penalties for government officials who “falsifies land records, fraudulently issues or alters documents, fraudulently removes documents from the land register, or mutilates any land register or Lands Commission document," and discusses women's ability to own land.

== Customary law ==
Customary laws in Ghana are sets of unique cultural decrees adhered to by individual Ghanaian tribes and ethnic groups. Customary law is incredibly important in the land ownership system in Ghana because 80% of all the land in Ghana is owned through customary law. Because no land in Ghana is considered free or without ownership, the customary law system has a huge part to play in the molding of land ownership and the facilitation of selling, developing, or inheriting land in a majority of the country.

Land is ruled by a stool or a skin. Stools and skins are region-specific names for chiefs in Ghana; stool is used in Southern Ghana and skin is used in Northern Ghana. Stools govern under a patrilineal inheritance system where land is inherited through the male's descendants within a marriage. Skins govern under a matrilineal system where fathers can only pass land to their sisters’ sons or males of maternal kin and daughters can inherit property rights from their mothers.

In facilitating the administration of land, regions governed by stools and skins practice different rules, but generally recognize at least a few of the seven main avenues for land acquisition. Citizens can gain land under customary rule by clearing forests, inheriting land through which ever mode of inheritance is recognized within their ethnic community, receive land as a gift, acquire land through a loan from a relative or friend, land purchase, crop sharing, or land leasing. In the past, citizens seeking to acquire land that was inhabited by a forest would organize the labor to clear that forest and have the right to own the land once the clearing was complete. It is now less common to acquire land through this avenue because there is not that much uncultivated land left in Ghana. A reduction in forest clearing thus lead to a rise in land purchases because citizens have to rely more on the land market in the absence of available forest land. While it is still difficult to sell land under customary law due to the ambiguity of rightful owners, and uncommon to sell land because most people prefer to keep land within their families, people may still choose to sell land if such a sale can be justified by the urgent need to raise money.

Under customary laws, it is difficult to decipher the real owner of a piece of land due to the lack of public information of ownership. In customary procedures, the process of acquisition can be complicated specifically because different family members can claim interest on a piece of land without each other knowing. The land is then left with multiple illegitimate owners.

== Relationship between statutory and customary law ==
Statutory law and customary law have a complex relationship in Ghana. While Ghana's constitution discusses the statutory aspects of property ownership, it also specifies that land disputes brought to court are decided under statutory laws even if the issue concerns customary property rules. This means that while customary law functions on its own, statutory laws must be adhered to within the customary framework.

In practice, this relationship is tricky to maintain, especially in the land acquisition and registration process. When potential buyers want to purchase a piece of land, they must get in contact with the owner of the land. However, if there are disputes concerning the customary laws that dictate the line of inheritance and identifies the legitimate owner of that piece of land, the true owner cannot be identified. Therefore, the potential buyer is unable to identify the actual owner to purchase the land from and is unable to register the land with the Lands Commission in order to acquire a land-title certification.

In many parts of Ghana, there is an uneven balance between the enforcement of customary and statutory laws. State leaders often pick and choose where they want to enforce land policies, directing more federal power in specific enclaves like Accra and Kumasi. This leaves chiefs mostly responsible for the local implementation of land laws. Leaders step back from most of their regulatory responsibility in most of the country, permitting chiefs to have more power in exchange for cooperation with the government. This allows chiefs to administer land through customary law without strict regard to statutory law.

Statutory and customary law also clash with each other when considering another aspect of ownership. The Administration of Lands Act, 1962 (Act 123) discusses the management of customary lands and grants the president the ability to declare him/herself a trustee of a piece of customary land if it is in his/her interest to do so. This gives the president a legal title to customary land while the actual beneficial interest is held by the customary community. However, in practice, the legal title and beneficial interest is held by the president, which grants management functions to the Lands Commission. Such a dynamic makes it difficult to determine who has true use and development power over customary land.
