= Civil and political rights =

Rights preventing the infringement of personal freedom by other social actors

Civil and political rights are a class of rights that protect individuals' freedom from infringement by governments, social organizations, and private individuals. They ensure one's entitlement to participate in the civil and political life of society and the state.

Civil rights generally include ensuring peoples' physical and mental integrity, life, and safety, protection from discrimination, the right to privacy, the freedom of thought, speech, religion, press, assembly, and movement.

Political rights include natural justice (procedural fairness) in law, such as the rights of the accused, including the right to a fair trial; due process; the right to seek redress or a legal remedy; and rights of participation in civil society and politics such as freedom of association, the right to assemble, the right to petition, the right of self-defense, and the right to vote. These rights also must follow the legal norm as in they must have the force of law and fit into the system of administrative justice. A key feature in modern society is that the more a state can guarantee political rights of citizens the better the states relations are with its citizens.

Civil and political rights form the original and main part of international human rights. They comprise the first portion of the 1948 Universal Declaration of Human Rights (with economic, social, and cultural rights comprising the second portion). The theory of three generations of human rights considers this group of rights to be "first-generation rights", and the theory of negative and positive rights considers them to be generally negative rights.

== History ==
The phrase "civil rights" is a translation of Latin jus civis (right of the citizen). Roman citizens could be either free (libertas) or servile (servitus), but they all had rights in law. After the Edict of Milan in 313, these rights included the freedom of religion; however, in 380, the Edict of Thessalonica required all subjects of the Roman Empire to profess Nicene Christianity. Roman legal doctrine was lost during the Middle Ages, but claims of universal rights could still be made based on Christian doctrine. According to the leaders of Kett's Rebellion (1549), "all bond men may be made free, for God made all free with his precious blood-shedding."

In the 17th century, English common law judge Sir Edward Coke revived the idea of rights based on citizenship by arguing that Englishmen had historically enjoyed such rights. The Parliament of England adopted the English Bill of Rights in 1689. It was one of the influences drawn on by George Mason and James Madison when drafting the Virginia Declaration of Rights in 1776. The Virginia declaration heavily influenced the U.S. Bill of Rights (1789).

The removal by legislation of a civil right constitutes a "civil disability". In early 19th century Britain, the phrase "civil rights" most commonly referred to the issue of such legal discrimination against Catholics. In the House of Commons, support for civil rights was divided, with many politicians agreeing with the existing civil disabilities of Catholics. The Roman Catholic Relief Act 1829 restored their civil rights.

In the United States, the term civil rights has been associated with the civil rights movement (1954–1968), which fought against racism. The movement also fought segregation and Jim Crow laws and this fight took place in the streets, in public places, in government, and in the courts including the Supreme Court. The civil rights movement was also not the only movement fighting for civil rights as The Black Panthers were also a group focused on fighting racism and Jim Crow.

Other things that civil rights have been associated with are not just race but also rights of Transgender and other LGBTQ individuals. These have been fights over sexuality instead of race and focused around whether these individuals may access certain spaces like bathrooms according to their sexual identity or biological sex. Gavin Grimm's fight in Virginia over whether he could use the bathroom of his choice is a well known case in these civil right fights.

Another issue in civil rights has been the issue with police brutality in certain communities especially minority communities. This has been seen as another way for minority groups to be oppressed and their rights infringed upon. Outrage has also been a massive result of incidents caught on tape of police abusing and in some cases causing the deaths of people from minority groups such as African Americans. That is why to address the issue has been accountability to police engaging in such conduct as a way to deter other officers from committing similar actions.

== Protection of rights ==
T. H. Marshall notes that civil rights were among the first to be recognized and codified, followed later by political rights and still later by social rights. In many countries, they are constitutional rights and are included in a bill of rights or similar document. They are also defined in international human rights instruments, such as the 1948 Universal Declaration of Human Rights and the 1966 International Covenant on Civil and Political Rights.

Civil and political rights need not be codified to be protected. However, most democracies worldwide do have formal written guarantees of civil and political rights. Civil rights are considered to be natural rights. Thomas Jefferson wrote in his A Summary View of the Rights of British America that "a free people [claim] their rights as derived from the laws of nature, and not as the gift of their chief magistrate."

The question of to whom civil and political rights apply is a subject of controversy. Although in many countries citizens are considered to have greater protections against infringement of rights than non-citizens, civil and political rights are generally considered to be universal rights that apply to all persons. One thing to mention is that if individuals have fewer political rights than are they more likely to commit political violence such as in countries where individual rights are highly restricted. That is why it is important for countries to protect the political rights of all citizens including minority groups. This extends to racial, ethnic, tribal, and religious groups. By granting them the same rights it helps reduce the risk of political violence breaking out.

According to political scientist Salvador Santino F. Regilme Jr., analyzing the causes of and lack of protection from human rights abuses in the Global South should be focusing on the interactions of domestic and international factors—an important perspective that has usually been systematically neglected in the social science literature.

== Other rights ==
Custom also plays a role. Implied or unenumerated rights are rights that courts may find to exist even though not expressly guaranteed by written law or custom; one example is the right to privacy in the United States, and the Ninth Amendment explicitly shows that other rights are also protected.

The United States Declaration of Independence states that people have unalienable rights including "Life, Liberty, and the pursuit of Happiness". It is considered by some that the sole purpose of government is the protection of life, liberty, and property.

Some thinkers have argued that the concepts of self-ownership and cognitive liberty affirm rights to choose the food one eats, the medicine one takes, and the habit one indulges.

== Social movements for civil rights ==
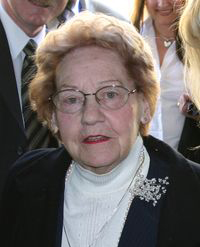
Savka Dabčević-Kučar, Croatian Spring participant; Europe's first female prime minister

Civil rights guarantee equal protection under the law. When civil and political rights are not guaranteed to all as part of equal protection of laws, or when such guarantees exist on paper but are not respected in practice, opposition, legal action and even social unrest may ensue.

Civil rights movements in the United States gathered steam by 1848 with such documents as the Declaration of Sentiment. Consciously modeled after the Declaration of Independence, the Declaration of Rights and Sentiments became the founding document of the American women's movement, and it was adopted at the Seneca Falls Convention, July 19 and 20, 1848.

Worldwide, several political movements for equality before the law occurred between approximately 1950 and 1980. These movements had a legal and constitutional aspect, and resulted in much law-making at both national and international levels. They also had an activist side, particularly in situations where violations of rights were widespread. Movements with the proclaimed aim of securing observance of civil and political rights included:

- the civil rights movement in the United States, where rights of black citizens had been violated;
- the Northern Ireland Civil Rights Association, formed in 1967 following failures in this province of the United Kingdom to respect the Roman Catholic minority's rights; and
- movements in many Communist countries, such as the Prague Spring and Charter 77 in Czechoslovakia and the uprisings in Hungary.

Most civil rights movements relied on the technique of civil resistance, using nonviolent methods to achieve their aims. In some countries, struggles for civil rights were accompanied, or followed, by civil unrest and even armed rebellion. While civil rights movements over the last sixty years have resulted in an extension of civil and political rights, the process was long and tenuous in many countries, and many of these movements did not achieve or fully achieve their objectives.

== Problems and analysis ==
Questions about civil and political rights have frequently emerged. For example, to what extent should the government intervene to protect individuals from infringement on their rights by other individuals, or from corporations—e.g., in what way should employment discrimination in the private sector be dealt with?

Political theory deals with civil and political rights. Robert Nozick and John Rawls expressed competing visions in Nozick's Anarchy, State, and Utopia and Rawls' A Theory of Justice. Other influential authors in the area include Wesley Newcomb Hohfeld, and Jean Edward Smith.

== First-generation rights ==
First-generation rights, often called "blue" rights, deal essentially with liberty and participation in political life. They are fundamentally civil and political in nature, as well as strongly individualistic: They serve negatively to protect the individual from excesses of the state. First-generation rights include, among other things, freedom of speech, the right to a fair trial, (in some countries) the right to keep and bear arms, freedom of religion, freedom from discrimination, and voting rights. They were pioneered in the seventeenth and eighteenth-century during the Age of Enlightenment. Political theories associated with the English, American, and French revolutions were codified in the English Bill of Rights in 1689 (a restatement of Rights of Englishmen, some dating back to Magna Carta in 1215) and more fully in the French Declaration of the Rights of Man and of the Citizen in 1789 and the United States Bill of Rights in 1791.

They were enshrined at the global level and given status in international law first by Articles 3 to 21 of the 1948 Universal Declaration of Human Rights and later in the 1966 International Covenant on Civil and Political Rights. In Europe, they were enshrined in the European Convention on Human Rights in 1953.

== Civil and political rights organizations ==
There are current organizations that exist to protect people's civil and political rights in case they are infringed upon. The ACLU, founded in 1920, is a well-known non-profit organization that helps to preserve freedom of speech and works to change policy. Another organization is the NAACP, founded in 1909, which focuses on protecting the civil rights of minorities. The NRA is a civil rights group founded in 1871 that primarily focuses on protecting the right to bear arms. These organizations serve a variety of causes, one being the AFL–CIO, which is America's union that represent the working-class people nationwide.

== See also ==
- Civics – Study of the rights and obligations of citizenry and government
- Civil liberties – Civil rights and freedoms that provide individual specific rights
- Discrimination – Prejudicial treatment based on membership in a certain group
- List of civil rights leaders
- Political equality
- Repression – Act of state entity involving restriction on the political freedom of citizens
