= Bundle of rights =

Legal rights that protect ownership of property

The bundle of rights is a metaphor to explain the complexities of property ownership. Law school professors of introductory property law courses frequently use this conceptualization to describe "full" property ownership as a partition of various entitlements of different stakeholders.

The concept originated with Wesley Newcomb Hohfeld in 1913, although he himself never used the phrase "bundle of rights". It was further developed and propagated to a broader audience in the form of the first Restatement of Property (published in five volumes between 1936 and 1944), because the Restatement's first reporter, Harry Bigelow, was a fan of Hohfeld's ideas.

The bundle of rights is commonly taught in first-year property courses in law schools in the United States to explain how property can simultaneously be "owned" by multiple parties. Before it was developed, the idea of property was seen in terms of dominion over a thing, as in the ability of the owner to place restrictions on others from interfering with the owner's property. The "bundle of rights," however, implies rules specifying, proscribing, or authorizing actions on the part of the owner.

Ownership of land is a much more complex proposition than simply acquiring all the rights to it. It is useful to imagine a bundle of rights that can be separated and reassembled. A "bundle of sticks" – in which each stick represents an individual right – is a common analogy made for the bundle of rights. Any property owner possesses a set of "sticks" related directly to the land.

For example, perfection of a mechanic's lien takes some, but not all, rights out of the bundle held by the owner. Extinguishing that lien returns those rights or "sticks" to the bundle held by the owner. In the United States (and under common law) the fullest possible title to real estate is called "fee simple absolute." Even the US federal government's ownership of land is restricted in some ways by state property law.

== Basic property rights ==
Traditionally, the bundle of rights concept encompassed five basic rights that may be held with respect to a parcel of real property.

- Right of possession (ius possidendi): an entity is the legal owner of the property.
- Right of control: the owner of this right can prescribe what activity takes place on the property, such as the building of structures or operating a business. This right is often shared between the title owner and governments or organizations that have some form of administrative jurisdiction over the property, such as a city with Zoning regulations, or a homeowner association.
- Right of exclusion (ius prohibendi): the owner of this right is able to prohibit others from entering the property (that is, trespassing).
- Right of enjoyment (ius utendi fruendi): the owner of this right is able to use the property as they see fit, including activities such as inhabitation and resource extraction. These activities are generally constrained by laws by jurisdictional agencies. In many legal regimes, portions of this right may be held or owned separately; For example, while the title owner may have the general right, a lease holder has been granted a temporary subsidiary right to inhabit the property, while someone else may own the rights to any subsurface minerals or water.
- Right of disposition (ius disponendi): the owner of the property is able to transfer any of the rights they hold to another party, whether temporarily (as in a lease) or permanently (as through inheritance or sale).

== Variations on the concept ==
Variations on the division between public and private property use can be found throughout the world. While the bundle of rights concept is strongly rooted in common law, there are comparable ideas in civil law systems and religious law systems. National, sub-national, and municipal laws strongly influence what title owners can do with their property in terms of physical development. Quasi-governmental bodies (such as utility companies) are also permitted to create easements across private property.

Historically the degrees of individual and community control over real property have varied greatly. The differences between capitalism, despotism, socialism, feudalism, and traditional societies often define different standards for land ownership. The bundle of rights concept looks much different when examined by different types of societies. For instance, a laissez-faire government would allow a much different bundle of rights than a communist government.

== Applications ==
Community land trusts and land banking are examples of efforts to rearrange the bundle of rights. This is typically done by dividing the responsibilities of ownership and management from the rights to use the property. A typical community land trust strategy is to hold ownership over the land and sell the structural improvements (residential or other buildings) to low-income homebuyers. This allows people to buy a home at a price far below the market rate and to realize the benefits of their property value improving.

Real Estate Investment Trusts divide up the bundle of rights in order to allow commercial investments in real property. These legal structures are becoming more common throughout the developed world.

=== Squatting ===
Squatting presents a non-economic way for people to transfer parts of the bundle of rights. Depending on the applicable laws, a squatter can acquire property rights by simply occupying vacant land for an extended period of time. Areas with high concentrations of squatters are sometimes thought of as informal settlements. Squatters face great instability due to their lack of title and governmental efforts at "blight removal".

"Squatting" can result in "adverse possession", that in common law, is the process by which title to another's real property is acquired without compensation, by holding the property in a manner that conflicts with the true owner's rights for a specified period of time. Circumstances of the adverse possession determine the type of title acquired by the adverse possessor, which may be fee simple title, mineral rights, or another interest in real property.

=== Examples of component rights ===
This table breaks down some of the various rights involved in real property ownership. Several of these rights can be transferred between different parties through sale or trade. Third parties can obtain the rights to access and profit from several of the public use rights without the consent of the title owner. This is often the case with resource extraction companies such as mines.

Title Owner	Public Use	Government	Third Party
Possession (right to use and occupy); Legal title; Mortgage; Lease; Sell; Subdivide the property; Create a covenant running with the land	Railroad; Public works; Electric power transmission lines; Air rights; Riparian water rights; Mineral rights; Grazing rights	Collect Property tax; Enforce a Lien; Protect Endangered species; Protect Wetlands; Zoning; Planning Permission/Development Rights (United Kingdom); Eminent domain; Prohibit noxious or nuisance uses	Possession – right to use and occupy as tenant; Freedom to roam; Homeowners association; Historic preservation; Conservation easement; Adverse possession

For example, a husband and wife can be owners (technically, title owners) of real property that is also encumbered by a mortgage and a mechanics lien. Their neighbor may have an easement for a utility line, and a license for entry and exit to a nearby plot of land. Airplanes have the right to fly through their airspace. Constitutionally, the state and federal governments always hold the right to condemnation, also called eminent domain, and the government at multiple levels retains various regulatory rights such as environmental regulation, zoning, and building code enforcement.

== See also ==
- List of real estate topics
- Property rights (economics)
- Real estate
