= Karel Vasak =

Czech-French diplomat, academic (1929–2015)

Karel Vasak or Karel Vašák (26 June 1929 – 1 May 2015) was a Czech-French international official and university professor.

Vasak was born in Czechoslovakia and later moved to France to study law. He decided to remain there after the Communist coup in Prague in February 1948. He acquired French citizenship and worked for the Council of Europe in several capacities.

In 1969, Vasak became the first Secretary-General of the International Institute of Human Rights in Strasbourg, a position which he held until 1980. He served as Director of the Division of Human Rights and Peace and later as Legal Advisor to UNESCO and the World Tourism Organization.

Vasak was the editor of a book called The International Dimensions of Human Rights which was published in 1982 (ISBN 0-313-23394-2).

He died on 1 May 2015 in Strasbourg.

== See also ==
- Equality of opportunity
- Three generations of human rights
