= Maastricht Guidelines on Violations of Economic, Social and Cultural Rights =

The 1997 Maastricht Guidelines on Violations of Economic, Social and Cultural Rights build on the 1987 Limburg Principles on the Implementation of the International Covenant on Economic, Social and Cultural Rights and identify the legal implications of acts and omissions which are violations of economic, social and cultural rights. The guidelines were adopted by a group of over thirty experts who convened from 22–26 January 1997 in Maastricht on the occasion of the Limburg Principles' 10th anniversary. Three years later, the Maastricht Guidelines along with the Limburg Principles were reissued as UN document E/C.12/2000/13 by the Committee on Economic, Social and Cultural Rights (CESCR).

== Background ==
In 1997, the International Commission of Jurists, the Urban Morgan Institute for Human Rights, and the Centre for Human Rights of the Faculty of Law of Maastricht University assembled for another workshop on the 10th anniversary of the Limburg Principles attempting to determine the possibility of using a "violations approach" to help monitor the International Covenant on Economic, Social and Cultural Rights (ICESCR). The assembly had three objectives: to have a better understanding of the concept of economic, social and cultural rights violations; to compile and classify types of violations of these rights; and to develop a set of guidelines which would help institutions in monitoring economic, social and cultural rights.

== Content ==
In total, 32 guidelines categorised under five sections make up the Maastricht Guidelines. These guidelines were agreed upon unanimously by the participants of the workshop, and were understood to reflect the development of international law since 1986. Section 1 emphasises the significance of economic, social and cultural rights; Section 2 examines obligations owed by states in their pursuit of realising economic, social and cultural rights, and lists particular acts and omissions which amount to violations; Section 3 declares that any violations are attributable to the state and must ensure that mechanisms to remedy violations are available to victims; Section 4 devotes its attention to victims of violations as their rights were not respected, protected and fulfilled, contrary to ICESCR; and Section 5 simply contains remedies and other possible responses to violations of rights.

=== Section 1 - The significance of economic, social and cultural rights ===
This section and the five guidelines contained within it preface the rest of the guidelines found in the instrument by emphasising the growing importance of economic, social and cultural rights in the world. Guideline 1 notes that the gap between the rich and the poor had doubled in the previous three decades prior to this instrument's conception, and that such a disparity makes economic, social and cultural rights deceptive and difficult to obtain. Guideline 2 comments on the growing trend of reliance on the free market principle to resolve problems of human welfare, and that now more than ever, states must fulfil their obligations of protecting and promoting economic, social and cultural rights. Guideline 3 refers to examples of significant legal development regarding economic, social and cultural rights in Europe and in the Americas, and the optional protocols for both ICESCR and the Convention on the Elimination of All Forms of Discrimination Against Women (CEDAW) which allow for individual and collective complaints. Guideline 4 reaffirms that "all human rights are universal, indivisible and interdependent and interrelated" as proclaimed under the fifth declaration of the Vienna Declaration and Programme of Action and would therefore mean that states are as responsible for economic, social and cultural rights as they are for civil and political rights. Guideline 5 states that although the considerations within the Guidelines primarily relate to ICESCR and are built upon the Limburg Principles, they are still relevant in "the interpretation and application of other norms of international and domestic law in the field of economic, social and cultural rights."

=== Section 2 - The meaning of violations of economic, social and cultural rights ===
Section 2 not only examines obligations owed by states in their pursuit of realising economic, social and cultural rights, and lists violations; it also gives significance to a range of issues which relate to violations of economic, social and cultural rights, and places great importance to obligations which arise from ICESCR. Guideline 6 imposes obligations on states to respect, protect and fulfil economic, social and cultural rights. It then uses examples such as the right to housing, the right to health, and the right to work, to demonstrate how states may comply with those obligations and how they can also violate those obligations. Guideline 7 states that the duties to respect, protect and fulfil inherently contain the obligations of conduct and of result. Using the right to health as an example to show the nature of both obligations and how equal all human rights are. Guideline 8 allows states a 'margin of discretion' in implementing respective obligations. This legal doctrine takes into account cultural, religious, and historical differences between states who have the same obligations, but does not allow states to go below the 'universal minimum standard' of economic, social and cultural rights. Guidelines 9 and 10 determine that despite the relative wealth of a country, minimum core obligations are binding on all states to satisfy a minimum standard for each right in ICESCR. Guideline 10 expands upon this by stating that realisation of economic, social and cultural rights may depend on the availability of financial and material resources, but scarcity of resources does not relieve states of minimum obligations to implement such rights. Guideline 11 defines the nature of any human rights violation; and states that violations of economic, social and cultural rights can occur in various ways. It also outlines that the grounds of discrimination, both de jure and de facto, where they affect the enjoyment of economic, social and cultural rights, constitute a violation of ICESCR. Guideline 12 states that rights relating to women in ICESCR are compatible with the underlying principles of CEDAW, and is understood to require the elimination of discrimination arising from social and cultural disadvantages. Guideline 13 attempts to help distinguish the line between inability and unwillingness, and puts the burden of proof on the state to prove that it was unable to carry out its obligations for reasons beyond its control. Guideline 14 contains acts which constitute a violation of economic, social and cultural rights; these include acts committed by non-state actors which the state has some control over. Commentary on the Maastricht Guidelines indicate that although the acts listed in Guideline 14 are generic, they are premised by the fact that all human rights have positive and negative obligations. Guideline 15 lists ten violations which are worded generally to be made applicable in a broad range of situations and jurisdictions. All ten are positive obligations phrased in a negative manner as to qualify the omission of them as a violation of a state's duty in undertaking the realisation of economic, social and cultural rights.

=== Section 3 - Responsibility for violations ===
Section 3 assigns responsibility to states for violations which are set out under Section 2 of the Maastricht Guidelines. Guideline 16 establishes that violations occurring within a state's jurisdiction is imputable to that state, and that the state must have mechanisms in place to remedy and investigate violations, among other things. Guideline 17 acknowledges the possibility of states not being in effective control of territories, and therefore attributing the violation of economic, social and cultural rights to them would be seen as unfair; to get around this, Guideline 17 imposes the obligations found in Section 2 to the dominating power who has control over the territory. Guideline 18 emphasises that economic, social and cultural rights can also be violated by entities other than states; with which inaction of a state in regulating their conduct will attribute the responsibility for the violation to the state. Guideline 19 asserts that the obligation of states does not stop within their jurisdiction, but also extends to their participation in international organisations. Another obligation is imposed by Guideline 19 on states to ensure that policies and activities of international organisations do not commit any violations.

=== Section 4 - Victims of violations ===
Section 4 as a whole focuses on the victims as they are important in the interest to ensure that rights are respected, protected and fulfilled. Guideline 20 helps identify which groups and individuals are most vulnerable to suffer economic, social and cultural rights violations; in doing so, states can focus their attention to these groups which are most at risk. Guideline 21 relates directly to the obligations to respect and protect a person's economic, social and cultural rights; as punishing victims for their status which others have caused undermines their rights under ICESCR.

=== Section 5 - Remedies and other responses to violations ===
Section 5 contains remedies and other appropriate responses to violations of rights. Guideline 22 provides that economic, social and cultural rights are justiciable, and that victims of these rights should have access to remedies in the domestic and international levels. Guideline 23 entitles victims to adequate remedies such as restitution, compensation, and rehabilitation. Guideline 24 states that common law courts should be careful in their judgements relating to violations of economic, social and cultural rights as not to sanction a violation of their respective state's international obligation. Guideline 25 encourages national institutions such as human rights commissions to address violations of economic, social and cultural rights as equally as they do violations of civil and political rights. Guideline 26 encourages states to incorporate international instruments into their legal system to enhance the scope and effectiveness of economic, social and cultural rights, as well as remedies for victims of violations. Guideline 27 urges states to develop measures which would ensure that no violators have any immunity from liability in breaching economic, social and cultural rights. Guideline 28 affirms a recommendation by the International Commission of Jurists in the Bangalore Declaration and Plan of Action 1995 stating;

In order to achieve effective judicial and other remedies for victims ... the legal community generally should pay far greater attention to these violations in the exercise of their professions...

Guideline 29 recommends the former United Nations Commission on Human Rights (now the United Nations Human Rights Council) to appoint special rapporteurs to strengthen mechanisms with respect to preventing and monitoring, among other things, violations of economic, social and cultural rights. Guideline 30 encourages states and international bodies to "actively pursue the adoption of new standards..." in relation to economic, social and cultural rights, as the state's obligations would be clearer if they adopted their own standards. Guideline 31 encourages the adoption of optional protocols for ICESCR, CEDAW, and the United Nations Convention on the Rights of the Child (UNCRC) to better show the equality of all human rights. Guideline 32 encourages the active monitoring and documenting of violations of economic, social and cultural rights by all relevant actors in order to help everyone fully enjoy such rights.

== Application and legacy ==
The Maastricht Guidelines are used in the Handbook for National Human Rights Institutions which is a document released by the United Nations Office of the High Commissioner for Human Rights to help promote the importance of economic, social and cultural rights. Academics interpret domestic legislation which provide for economic, social and cultural rights as complying with the Maastricht Guidelines in order to fully realise these class of rights; an example of this is the commentary on the South African Constitution with regards to socio-economic rights.

=== Optional protocols ===
The Optional Protocols for ICESCR, CEDAW, and UNCRC have all been developed and adopted by a majority of states since 1997. These optional protocols are in line with Guidelines 3 and 31, where both guidelines intertwine to encourage the adoption of optional protocols which not only allow for individual and collective complaints, but also the equality and importance of all rights.

== See also ==
- Extraterritorial Obligations
- Economic, social and cultural rights
- International Bill of Human Rights
- International human rights law
