= Economic, social and cultural rights =

Socio-economic human rights

Economic, social and cultural rights (ESCR) are socio-economic human rights, such as the right to education, right to housing, right to an adequate standard of living, right to health, victims' rights and the right to science and culture. Economic, social and cultural rights are recognised and protected in international and regional human rights instruments. Member states have a legal obligation to respect, protect and fulfil economic, social and cultural rights and are expected to take "progressive action" towards their fulfilment.

The Universal Declaration on Human Rights recognises a number of economic, social and cultural rights and the International Covenant on Economic, Social and Cultural Rights (ICESCR) is the primary international legal source of economic, social and cultural rights. The Convention on the Rights of the Child and the Convention on the Elimination of All Forms of Discrimination Against Women recognises and protects many of the economic, social and cultural rights recognised in the ICESCR in relation to children and women. The Convention on the Elimination of All Forms of Racial Discrimination prohibits discrimination on the basis of racial or ethnic origin in relation to a number of economic, social and cultural rights. The Convention on the Rights of Persons with Disabilities also prohibits all discrimination on the basis of the disability including refusal of the reasonable accommodation relating to full enjoyment of economic, social and cultural rights.

== International and regional human rights instruments ==
Women's economic rights in 2011

Economic, social and cultural rights are recognized and protected in a number of international and regional human rights instruments.

=== International human rights instruments ===
The Universal Declaration on Human Rights (UDHR), adopted by the UN General Assembly in 1948, is one of the most important sources of economic, social and cultural rights. It recognizes the right to social security in Article 22, the right to work in Article 23, the right to rest and leisure in Article 24, the right to an adequate standard of living in Article 25, the right to education in Article 26, and the right to benefits of science and culture in Article 27.

The International Covenant on Economic, Social and Cultural Rights (ICESCR) is the primary international legal source of economic, social and cultural rights. The Covenant recognized and protects the right to work and to just and favorable working conditions in Article 6 and 7, the right to join trade unions and take collective labor action in Article 8, the right to social security in Article 9, the right to protection of the family, including protection for mothers and children, in Article 10, the right to an adequate standard of living, including the right to food and the right to housing, in Article 11, the right to health in Article 12, the right to education in Article 13, as well as the right to participate in cultural life and the right to benefits of science and culture in Article 15. The International Covenant on Civil and Political Rights, adopted at the same time as the ICESCR, recognizes and protects a number of core economic, social and cultural rights, including the right to join trade unions in Article 22, and the right of ethnic, religious or linguistic minorities to engage in their culture, practice their religion and use their language in Article 27.

A number of other major international human rights instruments contain provisions relating to economic, social and cultural rights. The Convention on the Rights of the Child recognizes and protects many of the economic, social and cultural rights recognized in the ICESCR in relation to children. Including the right to health in Article 24, the right to social security in Article 25, the right to an adequate standard of living in Article 27, the right to education in Article 28, and the right to protection from economic exploitation (see child labour) in Article 32. The Convention on the Elimination of All Forms of Racial Discrimination prohibits discrimination on the basis of racial or ethnic origin in relation to a number of economic, social and cultural rights. The Convention on the Elimination of All Forms of Discrimination Against Women affirms a range of economic, social and cultural rights to women. The ILO Conventions of the International Labour Organization (ILO) protect a range of work related economic, social and cultural rights. Common global standards were agreed by some 195 states in the Recommendation on Science and Scientific protect and reassert scientific freedoms, the rights of scientists, and rights of research subjects, and the right of everyone to science.

=== Regional human rights instruments ===
The African Charter on Human and Peoples' Rights protects the right to work in Article 15, the right to health in Article 16, and the right to education in Article 17. The European Social Charter protects a wide range of economic, social and cultural rights, including the right to work, to favourable working conditions, the right to join trade unions and to take collective labour action in Article 1 to 10, the right to health in Article 11, the right to social security, including the right to medical assistance and the right to social welfare services, in Article 12 to 14, protection of especially vulnerable groups are enshrined in Article 15 to 17 and 19, and right to housing in Article 31. The Protocol of San Salvador protects a range of economic, social and cultural rights within the Inter-American human rights system.

== Secondary legal sources ==
A range of secondary legal sources exist on economic, social and cultural rights which provide guidance on their normative definition. An important secondary legal source is the United Nations Committee on Economic, Social and Cultural Rights which is overseeing the implementation of the International Covenant on Economic, Social and Cultural Rights (ICESCR). The Committee has been central in developing the normative definition of key economic, social and cultural rights, interpreting the role of State Parties to the ICESCR, and monitoring protection and violation of the ICESCR rights. The Committee issues guiding pronouncements in the form of general comments, and other human rights treaty bodies may also issue comments relevant to economic, social and cultural rights.

Other important secondary legal sources on economic, social and cultural rights are the Limburg Principles on the Implementation of the International Covenant on Economic, Social and Cultural Rights 1987 and the Maastricht Guidelines on Violations of Economic, Social and Cultural Rights 1997. The Limburg Principles have been extensively used in national legal systems as an interpretive tool for establishing violations of economic, social and cultural rights. The Maastricht Guidelines build on the Limburg Principles and identify the legal implications of acts and omissions which are violations of economic, social and cultural rights. Various United Nations Special Rapporteurs have influenced the normative development of economic, social and cultural rights. Appointed by the Commission on Human Rights and its sub-commissions, key rapporteurs include the Special Rapporteur on the Realization of Economic, Social and Cultural Rights, the Special Rapporteur on the Right to Adequate Housing, the Special Rapporteur on the Right to Education, and the Special Rapporteur on Violence Against Women.

== National constitutions ==
A number of national constitutions recognize economic, social and cultural rights. For example, the 1996 Constitution of South Africa includes economic, social and cultural rights and the South African Constitutional Court has heard claims under these obligations (see Grootboom and Treatment Action Campaign cases). The Supreme Court of India has interpreted Article 21 of the Constitution to contain positive social rights.

Constitutional recognition of economic, social and cultural rights has long been thought to be counterproductive, given that courts might be tasked to adjudicate them, and hence disrupt the democratic chains of accountability of the so-called elected branches. Nonetheless, a growing literature from the Global South has tracked very different judicial responses.

Sympathetic critics argue that socio-economic rights appear 'quite negligible' factors in terms of ensuring overall human development. Contemporary welfare states tend to emphasize decommodification, general welfare and the common good, not rights. Sweden, Finland, and Denmark, for example, adhere to a comparatively robust welfare effort, built primarily through social democratic parties and trade union mobilisation, without relying on judicial review of socio-economic rights. Nonetheless, majoritarian political arenas such as parliaments and trade union structures may remain unresponsive to minorities. The gains won through litigation, modest though they may be, can nonetheless be of value for those who benefit from them.

Civil society movements have advanced alternative institutions, norms and practices for constitution-making and making socio-economic rights effective. Participants in recent constitution-making experiments in Iceland, Bolivia and Ecuador have all linked economic and social rights to new institutional arrangements such as participatory budgeting or technologically-enhanced direct democracy as well as to new norms and discourses, notably those concerning ecological stewardship and the commons as well as care and social reproduction. In Ireland, social movements such as the 'Right2Water' and 'Repeal the 8th' campaigns have demonstrated how highly networked individuals and communities can mobilise both alongside and outside of traditional institutions, act collectively, and advance economic, social and cultural rights.

== State responsibility ==
Economic, social and cultural right enshrined in international and regional human rights instruments are legally binding. Member states have a legal obligation to respect, protect and fulfil these rights. The exact nature of states' obligations in this respect has been established principally in relation to the International Covenant on Economic, Social and Cultural Rights (ICESCR), and further Optional Protocol to the International Covenant on Economic, Social and Cultural Rights has been established in accordance with Vienna Declaration and Programme of Action.

State parties to the ICESCR are required to take "progressive action" towards fulfilment of the ICESR rights. While immediate fulfilment may not be possible due to the economic situation of a country, postponement of proactive action is not permitted. State parties must show genuine efforts to secure the economic, social and cultural rights enshrined in the ICESCR. The burden of proof for progressive action is considered on be with the state party. The prohibition on discrimination in relation to economic, social and cultural rights is regarded as having immediate effect. State parties must abolish laws, policies and practices which affect the equal enjoyment of economic, social and cultural rights and take action to prevent discrimination in public life. All state parties, regardless of the economic situation in the country or resource scarcity, are required to ensure respect for minimum subsistence rights for all. State parties must also ensure that available resources are accessed and used equitably. Therefore, government decisions on how to allocate resources should be subject to scrutiny. Legislative measures alone are not sufficient to ensure compliance with the ICESCR and state parties are expected to provide judicial remedies in addition to taking administrative, financial, educational and social measures.

== Monitoring, enforcement and implementation framework ==
Intergovernmental organisations and non-governmental organisations (NGOs) have persistently neglected economic, social and cultural rights over the past 50 years. While all human rights are said to be "equal, indivisible, interrelated, and interdependent", the monitoring, enforcement and implementation framework for economic, social and cultural rights is less advanced than that for civil and political rights. International enforcement mechanisms are strongest for civil and political rights, and their violation is considered more serious than that of economic, social and cultural rights. There are few international NGOs that focus on economic, social and cultural rights and there are few lawyers who have the knowledge or experience to defend economic, social and cultural rights at a national or international level. Economic, social and cultural rights are less likely than civil and political rights to be protected in national constitutions.

In 2008, the United Nations General Assembly adopted the Optional Protocol to the International Covenant on Economic, Social and Cultural Rights, which gives the Committee on Economic, Social and Cultural Rights competence to receive and consider communications from individuals claiming that their rights under the Covenant have been violated by a state party. The Protocol entered into force on 5 May 2013.

In 2017, for the common global standards in the Recommendation on Science and Scientific Researchers relating to the right to science, states agreed at the UNESCO General Conference to adopt four-yearly reporting on implementation, and agreed that UNESCO's Executive Board is competent to manage monitoring, with the networks of UNESCO National Commissions and academic partners mobilized in countries to ensure implementation and monitoring at country level. For the other major international human rights conventions mentioned above there are various other treaty bodies to ensure some monitoring of implementation. And each may transmit to the Human Rights Council reports of individual cases when a state is the subject of a Universal Periodic Review.

== Education as a human right ==
Education is guaranteed as a human right in many human rights treaties, including:

- The Convention against Discrimination in Education(1960, CADE).
- The International Covenant on Economic, Social and Cultural Rights(1966, ICESCR).
- The Convention on the Elimination of All Forms of Discrimination Against Women (1979, CEDAW).
- The Convention on the Rights of the Child(1989, CRC).

The right to education places the individual at the centre of education frameworks.

Education as a human right has the following characteristics:

- It is a right; Education is not a privilege or subject to political or charitable whims. It is a human right. It places mandatory demands on duty-bearers (particularly the state, but also parents, children, and other actors).
- It is universal; Everyone has the right to education without discrimination. This includes children, adolescents, youths, adults, and older people.
- It is high priority; Education is a key priority of the state. Obligations to ensure the right to education cannot be dismissed.
- It is a key right; Education is instrumental in ensuring all other human rights. It has economic, social, cultural, civil, and political dimensions.

The right to education places legal obligations on states when they make decisions regarding education and the education system. It offers an internationally agreed normative framework for the standards that states must not fall beneath concerning the education of its citizens and non-citizens.

Education as a multiplier right

These standards define what states must do and avoid doing in order to ensure the dignity of the individual. The right to education is broad and covers many aspects of education. This means that for the specific areas related to education, states must act within the boundaries permitted under international human rights law (IHRL).

The main aspects of education are:

- The aims of education.
- Non-discrimination and equality in the education system.
- Free and compulsory universal primary education.
- Available and accessible, free education at the secondary level, including vocational education.
- Accessible (on the basis of capacity), free education at the tertiary level.
- Fundamental education for those who have not received all or part of their primary education.
- Maintenance of an education system at all levels.
- Provision of a fellowship system.
- The training of teachers, their status, and their working conditions.
- Educational freedom, that is, the freedom of parents to have their children educated in accordance with their religious and moral convictions.
- The freedom of individuals and organizations to set-up private schools.
- quality education, including setting minimum standards regarding infrastructure and human rights education
- safe and non-violent learning environments
- the allocation of adequate resources
- academic freedom at all levels of education
- the settings and contents of the curriculum.
- Transparent and accountable education systems.

== Advocacy ==
Networking groups such as ESCR-Net are working to create online resources and spread information about effective cases, initiatives, and working groups promoting ideals and celebrating victories of human rights initiatives and the Optional Protocol to the International Covenant on Economic, Social and Cultural Rights. Currently, human rights advocacy groups are working diligently to fine-tune rules, regulations and implementation schemes; little news of complaint successes or failures is available. The Centre on Housing Rights and Evictions (COHRE) has helped to establish the Housing and Property Directorate (HPD/HPCC) in Kosovo.

== Theory of rights ==
According to Karel Vasak's theory of three generations of human rights, economic, social and cultural rights are considered second-generation rights, while civil and political rights, such as freedom of speech, right to a fair trial, and the right to vote, are considered first-generation rights. The theory of negative and positive rights considers economic, social and cultural rights positive rights. Social rights are "rights to the meeting of basic needs that are essential for human welfare." Examples of social rights include the right to healthcare and the right to decent working conditions.

== See also ==
- Constitutional economics
- Constitutionalism
- Cultural rights
- Economic security
- Human right to water and sanitation
- Human rights inflation
- Human security
- International labour standard
- Millennium Development Goals
- Right to education
- Right to health
- Rule according to higher law
- Security of person
- Social pension
- Social protection floor
- Social rights
- Social safety net
- Three generations of human rights
- Universal health care
- Welfare rights

== Sources ==
- This article incorporates text from a free content work. Licensed under CC BY-SA 3.0 IGO. Text taken from Right to education handbook, 276, UNESCO, Right to Education Initiative (UK), UNESCO. UNESCO.
