= Optional Protocol to the International Covenant on Economic, Social and Cultural Rights =

Complaints mechanism in international law

States parties and signatories to the Optional Protocol to the ICESCR: states parties non-state parties signatories non-state parties non-signatories

The Optional Protocol to the International Covenant on Economic, Social and Cultural Rights is an international treaty establishing complaint and inquiry mechanisms for the International Covenant on Economic, Social and Cultural Rights. It was adopted by the UN General Assembly on 10 December 2008, and opened for signature on 24 September 2009. As of November 2024, the Protocol has 46 signatories and 30 state parties. It entered into force on 5 May 2013.

== Genesis ==
In 1966, the United Nations General Assembly adopted the International Covenant on Economic, Social and Cultural Rights. The Covenant obliged its parties to recognise and progressively implement economic, social, and cultural rights, including labour rights and right to health, right to education, and right to an adequate standard of living, but did not include any mechanism by which these obligations could be legally enforced.

Work on an individual complaints mechanism began in 1990, with a view to developing an Optional Protocol similar to those of other UN human rights instruments. Development was encouraged by the 1993 World Conference on Human Rights, which recommended the Commission on Human Rights and CESCR to "continue examination of optional protocols" to the ICESCR.

CESCR presented the first draft Optional Protocol in 1997. In 2002, the committee established an open-ended working group to continue development. In 2006, the Human Rights Council gave the open-ended working group the task of formally negotiating a draft text. Negotiations were completed in April 2008, and the resulting Optional Protocol was formally adopted by the UN General Assembly on 10 December 2008. It was opened for signature on 24 September 2009.

== Summary ==
The Optional Protocol establishes an individual complaints mechanism for the Covenant similar to those of the First Optional Protocol to the International Covenant on Civil and Political Rights, Optional Protocol to the Convention on the Rights of Persons with Disabilities and Article 14 of the Convention on the Elimination of All Forms of Racial Discrimination. Parties agree to recognise the competence of the Committee on Economic, Social and Cultural Rights to consider complaints from individuals or groups who claim their rights under the Covenant have been violated. Complainants must have exhausted all domestic remedies, and anonymous complaints and complaints referring to events which occurred before the country concerned joined the Optional Protocol are not permitted. The committee can request information from and make recommendations to a party. Parties may also opt to permit the committee to hear complaints from other parties, rather than just individuals.

The Protocol also includes an inquiry mechanism. Parties may permit the committee to investigate, report on and make recommendations on "grave or systematic violations" of the Covenant. Parties may opt out of this obligation on signature or ratification.

The Optional Protocol required ten ratifications to come into force.

== See also ==
- International Covenant on Economic, Social and Cultural Rights
- First Optional Protocol to the International Covenant on Civil and Political Rights
- Optional Protocol to the Convention on the Elimination of All Forms of Discrimination against Women
- Optional Protocol to the Convention on the Rights of Persons with Disabilities
