= Right to science and culture =

Human right

The right to science and culture is one of the economic, social and cultural rights claimed in the Universal Declaration of Human Rights and related documents of international human rights law. It recognizes that everyone has a right to freely participate in culture, to freely share in (to participate and to benefit from) science and technology, and to protection of authorship. This right requires States to create conditions that enable cultural participation and access to scientific progress. It involves promoting education and research, supporting artistic and scientific institutions, and ensuring that knowledge and innovation are accessible to all. The right also calls for safeguarding the moral and material interests of creators and researchers while combating obstacles such as censorship, inequality, and lack of resources that restrict access to cultural and scientific life.

== Recognition under Universal Declaration ==
The right to science and culture is expressed in Article 27 of the Universal Declaration of Human Rights:

(1) Everyone has the right freely to participate in the cultural life of the community, to enjoy the arts and to share in scientific advancement and its benefits. (2) Everyone has the right to the protection of the moral and material interests resulting from any scientific, literary or artistic production of which he is the author.

The right to science and culture also appears in Article 15 of the International Covenant on Economic, Social and Cultural Rights:

(1) The States Parties to the present Covenant recognize the right of everyone:

(a) To take part in cultural life;

(b) To enjoy the benefits of scientific progress and its applications;

(c) To benefit from the protection of the moral and material interests resulting from any scientific, literary or artistic production of which he is the author.

(2) The steps to be taken by the States Parties to the present Covenant to achieve the full realization of this right shall include those necessary for the conservation, the development and the diffusion of science and culture.

(3) The States Parties to the present Covenant undertake to respect the freedom indispensable for scientific research and creative activity.

(4) The States Parties to the present Covenant recognize the benefits to be derived from the encouragement and development of international contacts and co-operation in the scientific and cultural fields.

== Related concepts and disambiguation ==
The right to science and culture is often broken into rights such as "the right to take part in cultural life" or "the right to cultural participation" or "the right to culture", and "the right to benefit from scientific progress and its applications" or "the right to benefit from science" or "the right to science" or "the right to share in science".

The term "cultural rights" may be used in at least three senses. It is most often used to refer to the concept protected by Article 15 of the International Covenant on Economic, Social and Cultural Rights, which assures minority groups the right to practice and preserve their languages, religions, art forms, and ways of life. Alternatively, the term "cultural rights" may be used to group both minority rights and the right to science and culture, which have a common origin in Article 27 of the Universal Declaration. Even more broadly, "cultural rights" may refer to a larger category of economic, social and cultural rights, which may be understood to refer to the right to science and culture as well as the right to education and other rights, such as the protection of authorship.

The "right to science" includes both a right to participate in science (the activity) and a right to access to the body of knowledge ("benefits" or "progress" or "advances") that is a result of science.

== Scholarly interpretation and advocacy ==
All human rights found in the Universal Declaration of Human Rights require a process of interpretation to translate the broad principles into specific state obligations. This takes place through United Nations processes and in national courts. The process is strongly influenced by human rights scholars and human rights activists.

The rights found in Article 27 in some ways remain at a relatively early stage in this process, in contrast to other human rights such as the right to health or the right to education that have already been the subject of more extensive elaboration and litigation. The right to authorship has however benefitted from very strong legal development.

Common global standards for application of the right to science were set out by a UN agreement called the Recommendation on Science and Scientific Researchers, adopted by consensus of some 195 governments meeting in Paris on 13 November 2017, after four years of global consultations.

Some authors particularly active in this area include: Samantha Besson, Audrey R. Chapman, Yvonne Donders, Laurence Helfer, Lea Shaver, William Schabas, Jessica Wyndham, and Peter Yu.

The American Association for the Advancement of Science is active in advocacy around the right to science and culture, with a particular focus on the rights and responsibilities of professional scientists.

== Official interpretations ==
The Committee on Economic, Social and Cultural Rights has issued two General Comments interpreting portions of the right to science and culture as it appears in the International Covenant on Economic Social and Cultural Rights (ICESCR). General Comment 17 and General Comment 21. The Special Rapporteur in the Field of Cultural Rights, Farida Shaheed, addressed the right to science and culture in several reports between 2010 and 2015.

At the General Conference of UNESCO in 2017, some 195 states agreed by consensus with no abstentions to common global standards relating to the right to science, in a Recommendation on Science and Scientific Researchers, which interprets the right to science as it appears in the Universal Declaration of Human Rights.

== Relationship to intellectual property ==
In 2000 the United Nations Economic and Social Council Sub-commission on Human Rights suggested that the Agreement on Trade-Related Aspects of Intellectual Property Rights may violate the right to science and therefore conflict with international human rights law.A major challenge within the right to science and culture is balancing science as a public good with the private interests that influence its production and use. Scientific knowledge, inherently non-rival and non-excludable, exhibits the characteristics of a common good, yet its development often relies on private economic mechanisms such as patents, exclusive licenses, or commercial agreements, which can limit access to results. To ensure equitable application of the right to science, states must implement intellectual property regimes and research policies that promote the dissemination of publicly funded knowledge while maintaining incentives for private innovation. Transparency measures, public-interest exceptions, and inclusive participation mechanisms are essential to ensure that science serves both technological progress, social justice, and universal access to knowledge. The ultimate goal is to preserve science as a collective resource essential to sustainable development and human dignity.

== See also ==
- Academic freedom
- Cultural genocide
- Free culture movement
- Welfare rights
