= Palmisano =

Palmisano is an Italian surname. Notable people with the surname include:

- Andrea Palmisano (born 1988), Italian male rower
- August Palmisano (1928–1978), American mobster and tavern owner
- Antonella Palmisano (born 1991), Italian racewalker
- Conrad Palmisano (1948–2024), American stuntman and film director
- Giuseppe Palmisano (born 1963), Italian lawyer
- Joe Palmisano (born 1954), American football player and coach
- Joe Palmisano (baseball) (1902–1971), American baseball player
- Linea Palmisano (born 1976), American politician
- Marcello Palmisano (1940–1995), Italian journalist and reporter
- Mario Palmisano (born 1978), Italian rower
- Samuel J. Palmisano (born 1951), American business executive, IBM
- Sean Ryan Palmisano, American Navy SEAL and podcaster
- Valentina Palmisano (born 1983), Italian politician
- Vincent L. Palmisano (1882–1953), American politician from Maryland
