= Cultural rights =

Movement asserting the right to practise traditions of culture and language

Cultural rights are rights related to themes such as language; cultural and artistic production; participation in cultural life; cultural heritage; intellectual property rights; author's rights; minorities and access to culture, among others. The cultural rights movement has provoked attention to protect the rights of groups of people, or their culture, in similar fashion to the manner in which the human rights movement has brought attention to the needs of individuals throughout the world.

== Protecting culture ==
Cultural rights are rights related to art and culture, both understood in a large sense. The objective of these rights is to guarantee that people and communities have an access to culture, self-knowledge, and can participate in the culture of their selection. Cultural rights are human rights that aim at assuring the enjoyment of culture and its components in conditions of equality, human dignity and non-discrimination.

Focusing less on the preservation of cultures as an end in itself and more on the realization of "ecological" relations between cultural groups as a condition for equitable interactions and the potential for organic cultural change, Meyjes proposes the interchangeable terms "cultural justice", "ethno-cultural justice" and intercultural justice — which he defines as the principle of maximally accommodating the culturally-specific values and practices of minority groups and their members, in the form of rights, within the overall legal, regulatory, or policy limits of the institution, community, or society concerned (also see universalization).

== Preservation of minority cultures ==
Cultural rights of groups focus on religious and ethnic minorities and indigenous societies that are in danger of disappearing. Cultural rights include a group's ability to preserve its way of life, such as child rearing, continuation of language, and security of its economic base in the nation, which it is located.

The cultural rights movement has been popularized because much traditional cultural knowledge has commercial value, like ethno-medicine, cosmetics, cultivated plants, foods, folklore, arts, crafts, songs, dances, costumes, and rituals. Studying ancient cultures may reveal evidence about the history of the human race and shed more light on our origin and successive cultural development. However, the study, sharing, and commercialization of such cultural aspects can be hard to achieve without infringing upon the cultural rights of those who are a part of that culture. The commercialized consumption of minority cultures can lead to issues pertaining to cultural appropriation, such as the infringement of cultural property rights and misrepresentation of cultural identity.

=== Intangible cultural heritage ===
The preservation of minority cultures includes the protection of intangible cultural heritage, which are non-material aspects of culture such as practices, language, intellect, spirituality, and value systems. These non-material aspects are recognized as essential, distinctive, and authentic to the cultural group, and are consistently recreated and transmitted to future generations.

=== Intellectual property rights ===
The related notion of indigenous intellectual property rights (IPR) has arisen in attempt to conserve each society's culture base and prevent ethnocide. Indigenous groups have argued for their right to control the access and usage of their cultural knowledge and information. To address these concerns, proposals have been suggested: using labels and trademarks on products to indicate their indigenous origins, pursuing moral rights to sacred works in order to attribute credit to indigenous creators and artists, and protecting indigenous knowledge through confidentiality laws.

== Legal enforcement of cultural rights ==
=== Legal developments ===
==== International Covenant on Civil and Political Rights ====
In 1966, the General Assembly of the United Nations (UNGA) adopted the International Covenant on Civil and Political Rights (ICCPR). Article 27 of the ICCPR recognizes the cultural rights of minorities to practice their culture, religion, and language.

Legal cases have invoked Article 27 as the basis to their right to practice traditional activities and livelihood in regard to the use of indigenous land and resources. Kitok v. Sweden (1988) involved Ivan Kitok, an indigenous Sami man, who claimed that the Swedish law restricted his right to breed reindeer by removing his status as a Sami minority in the Reindeer Husbandry Act of 1971. Lubicon Lake Band v. Canada (1990) involved a Cree Indian band and their Chief Bernard Ominayak who sued the Alberta government for permitting oil companies to destroy their hunting and trapping lands for oil and gas.

==== Recommendation on the Safeguarding of Traditional Culture and Folklore ====
In 1989, the General Conference of the United Nations adopted the Recommendation on the Safeguarding of Traditional Culture and Folklore. The document was the first attempt of an international legal agreement to protect intangible cultural heritage by recognizing folklore as necessary to cultural identity. The General Conference determined that oral folklore could be at risk of being lost due to conflicts or dangers, and established recommendations to identify, conserve, preserve, disseminate, and protect folk traditions.

==== Agenda 21 for culture ====
Cultural rights should also be taken into consideration by local policies. The Agenda 21 for culture is the first document with worldwide mission that advocates establishing the groundwork of an undertaking by cities and local governments for cultural development. Developed in 2002, the document included cultural rights as one of the principles: “Local governments recognize that cultural rights are an integral part of human rights, taking as their reference the Universal Declaration of Human Rights (1948)”.

==== United Nations Declaration on the Rights of Indigenous Peoples ====
In 2007, UNGA passed the United Nations Declaration on the Rights of Indigenous Peoples (UNDRIP), which explicitly recognizes the cultural rights of indigenous people. The recognition of cultural rights also extends to the recognition of the rights to live on, use, and develop their lands and resources.

=== Legal limitations ===
==== Defining culture ====
Cultural rights scholars have criticized neglect towards legal reform and development of cultural rights. The concept of cultural rights has been continuously redefined since the creation of the Universal Declaration of Human Rights (UDHR). Article 27 of the UDHR focuses on the right to participate in cultural life, arts, and scientific advancements. The enforcement of protecting cultural rights is challenged by the lack of a concrete definition for culture, making it difficult for international bodies such as the Human Rights Committee to impose legal obligations on member states. Culture is a collective experience of social forces, including social activities, beliefs, and issues. It has a dynamic nature that is constantly changing according to the social, political, and economic circumstances in the present. Through this anthropological interpretation, culture is highly dependent on time and location, and as a result, international bodies have struggled to pinpoint its complexity in the legal language of rights.

==== Indigenous IPR ====
Indigenous efforts to pursue intellectual property rights have been challenged by the issue of protecting both tangible and intangible cultural heritage. Protecting intangible cultural heritage also involves other aspects beyond financial and legal issues — pursuing intellectual property rights may not be enough to cover ethical, spiritual, and moral issues that arise. Policymakers are concerned with what to define indigenous knowledge as; similar to defining the concept of culture, it is difficult to concretely define and identify indigenous knowledge without reinforcing cultural stereotypes and prejudices.

== See also ==
- Collective rights
- Cultural diversity
- Cultural property
- Ethnic group
- Human rights
- Right to science and culture
