= European decency threshold =

Income inequality metric

The Social Charter initially defined what many UK campaigning groups termed the Council of Europe decency threshold in the 1960s as 68% of average earnings within a national economy. The definition was modified to that of 60% of net earnings (as of July 2004) in order to take account of the difficulties experienced in taking into account initiatives such as redistributive tax systems when calculating adequate incomes.

There are a number of anomalies between the previous use of this threshold by UK campaigning groups and the way in which it is understood by the Secretariat of the European Social Charter. The exact origins of the term 'Council of Europe Decency Threshold' are vague, but it is said to be an incorrect term as the Council of Europe did not create it. It is therefore now more commonly referred to as the 'European Social Charter Adequate Remuneration Threshold' or ESCART.

Many pressure groups in the UK used the original method of calculation to call for a higher minimum wage. Before its closure, the Low Pay Unit used this threshold in campaigning in addition to calling for a minimum wage of half male median earnings, rising to 2/3 over the next few years. However, it (like many other organisations) had expressed reservations about the usefulness of the Threshold following the move to a definition of 60% of net average earnings, primarily because this was a far lower monetary amount than the Threshold as previously defined.

The Scottish Low Pay Unit, an independent organisation with similar aims to the now-defunct London based Low Pay Unit, continue to campaign for a higher National Minimum Wage in this way although they do not use the ESCART due to difficulties in obtaining accurate net earnings figures for the UK. They have also produced a briefing outlining the advantages and disadvantages of the calculation.
