= European Social Charter =

1961 Council of Europe treaty

Members of the 1961 Charter in light green; members of the Revised Charter in dark green; non-member states that nonetheless adhere to the Council of Europe in white

The European Social Charter is a Council of Europe treaty which was opened for signature on 18 October 1961 and initially became effective on 26 February 1965, after West Germany had become the fifth of the 13 signing nations to ratify it. By 1991, 20 nations had ratified it.

== Contents ==
The Charter was established to support the European Convention on Human Rights which is principally for civil and political rights, and to broaden the scope of protected fundamental rights to include social and economic rights. The Charter also guarantees positive rights and freedoms which concern all individuals in their daily existence.

The basic rights set out in the Charter are as follows: housing, health, education, labour rights, full employment, reduction of working hours, equal pay for equal work, parental leave, social security, social and legal protection from poverty and social exclusion, free movement of persons and non-discrimination, also the rights of migrant workers and that of the persons with disabilities.

States Parties to the Charter must submit annual reports on a part of the provisions of the Charter (be it the 1961 Charter or the 1996 Revised Charter), showing how they implement them in law and in practice.

== 1996 revision ==
The Charter was revised in 1996. The Revised Charter came into force in 1999 and is gradually replacing the initial 1961 treaty. The Charter sets out human rights and freedoms and establishes a supervisory mechanism guaranteeing their respect by the States parties.

Article 21 creates the right to information and consultation.

Article 22 creates the right to take part in the determination and improvement of the working conditions and working environment", or codetermination through representation on company or enterprise board of directors and work councils.

== European Committee of Social Rights ==
The European Committee of Social Rights (ECSR) is the body responsible for monitoring compliance in the States party to the Charter.

The ECSR is composed of 15 independent members who are elected by the Council of Europe's Committee of Ministers for a period of six years, renewable once.

Under the 1995 Additional Protocol providing for a system of Collective Complaints which came into force in 1998, complaints of violations of the Charter may be lodged with the ECSR.

Certain organisations are entitled to lodge complaints with the ECSR (a special list of NGOs has been established, made up of NGOs enjoying participatory status with the Council of Europe). The ECSR examines the complaint and, if the formal requirements have been met, declares it admissible. The State Party may then respond in writing, and a hearing may be requested by either party to the procedure. Finally, the Committee comes to a decision on the merits.

== See also ==
- European Convention on Human Rights
- European Convention for the Prevention of Torture and Inhuman or Degrading Treatment or Punishment
- European decency threshold
- EU labour law
- Charter of Fundamental Rights of the European Union
- Economic, social and cultural rights
- International human rights law
- Three generations of human rights
- List of Council of Europe treaties
