= Right to work =

Human right to engage in productive employment

The right to work is the concept that people have a human right to work, or to engage in productive employment, and should not be prevented from doing so. The right to work, enshrined in the United Nations 1948 Universal Declaration of Human Rights, is recognized in international human-rights law through its inclusion in the 1966 International Covenant on Economic, Social and Cultural Rights, where the right to work emphasizes economic, social and cultural development.

The Human Rights Measurement Initiative measures the right to work in countries around the world, based on their level of income.

== Definition ==
The Universal Declaration of Human Rights states in Article 23.1:

(1) Everyone has the right to work, to free choice of employment, to just and favourable conditions of work and to protection against unemployment.

— Universal Declaration of Human Rights, United Nations General Assembly

The International Covenant on Economic, Social and Cultural Rights states in Part III, Article 6:

(1) The States Parties to the present Covenant recognize the right to work, which includes the right of everyone to the opportunity to gain his living by work which he freely chooses or accepts, and will take appropriate steps to safeguard this right.

(2) The steps to be taken by a State Party to the present Covenant to achieve the full realization of this right shall include technical and vocational guidance and training programmes, policies and techniques to achieve steady economic, social and cultural development and full and productive employment under conditions safeguarding fundamental political and economic freedoms to the individual.

— International Covenant on Economic, Social and Cultural Rights, United Nations General Assembly

The African Charter on Human and Peoples' Rights also recognises the right, emphasising conditions and pay, i.e. labor rights. Article 15, states:

Every individual shall have the right to work under equitable and satisfactory conditions, and shall receive equal pay for equal work.

— African Charter on Human and Peoples' Rights, Organisation of African Unity

== History ==
The phrase "the right to work" was coined by the French socialist leader Louis Blanc in light of the social turmoil of the early 19th century and rising unemployment in the wake of the 1846 financial crisis which led up to the French Revolution of 1848. The right to property was a crucial demand in early quests for political freedom and equality, and against feudal control of property. Property can serve as the basis for the entitlements that ensure the realisation of the right to an adequate standard of living and it was only property owners which were initially granted civil and political rights, such as the right to vote. Because not everybody is a property owner, the right to work was enshrined to allow everybody to attain an adequate standard of living. Today discrimination on the basis of property ownership is recognised as a serious threat to the equal enjoyment of human rights by all and non-discrimination clauses in international human rights instruments frequently include property as a ground on the basis of which discrimination is prohibited (see the right to equality before the law).

The right to work, but also a duty, was placed in constitutions of the Soviet Union.

== Criticism ==
The Right to Be Lazy (1883) by Paul Lafargue, a French Marxist, criticized the concept of a right to work. He wrote: "And to think that the sons of the heroes of the Terror have allowed themselves to be degraded by the religion of work, to the point of accepting, since 1848, as a revolutionary conquest, the law limiting factory labor to twelve hours. They proclaim as a revolutionary principle the Right to Work. Shame to the French proletariat! Only slaves would have been capable of such baseness."

== See also ==
- Critique of work
- Decent work
- Equal pay for equal work
- Full employment
- International labor standards
- Involuntary unemployment
- Labor rights
- Job guarantee
- Protestant work ethic
- Refusal of work
- Right-to-work law
- Mahatma Gandhi National Rural Employment Guarantee Act
- Youth suffrage
- Youth rights
- Age of candidacy
- Eight-hour day
- Six-hour day
- Right to leisure
