= Right to housing =

Economic, social and cultural right

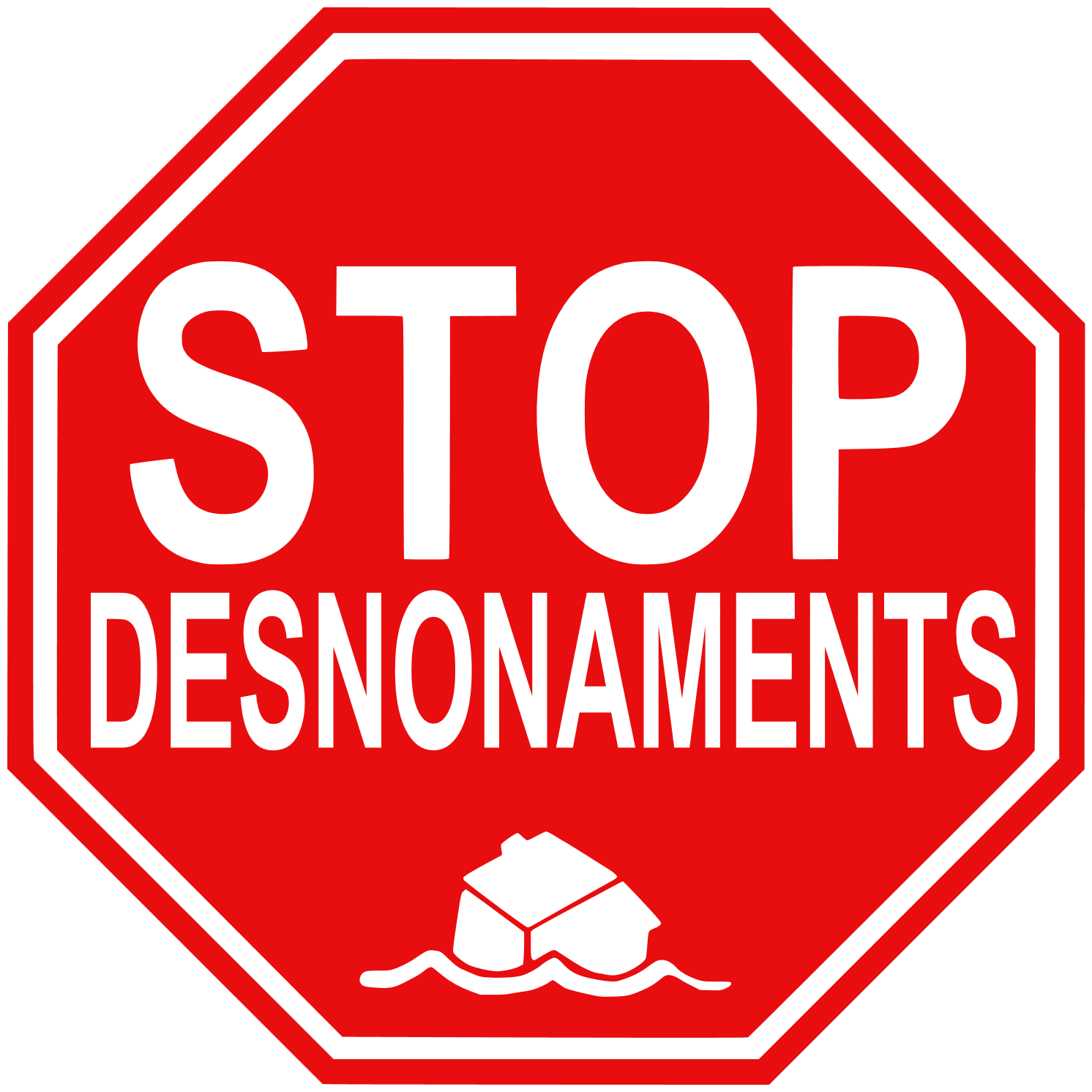
Logo of the Plataforma d'Afectats per la Hipoteca, a Catalan housing rights advocacy group, which means "Stop Evictions"

The right to housing (occasionally right to shelter) is the economic, social and cultural right to adequate housing and shelter. It is recognized in some national constitutions and in the Universal Declaration of Human Rights and International Covenant on Economic, Social and Cultural Rights. The right to housing is regarded as a freestanding right in the International human rights law which was clearly in the 1991 General Comment on Adequate Housing by the UN Committee on Economic, Social and Cultural Rights. The aspect of the right to housing under ICESCR include: availability of services, infrastructure, material and facilities; legal security of tenure; habitability; accessibility; affordability; location and cultural adequacy.

The UN Human Settlement Programme is known as UN-HABITAT.

At least 84 states make an explicit reference to housing rights in their constitutions.

== Definition ==
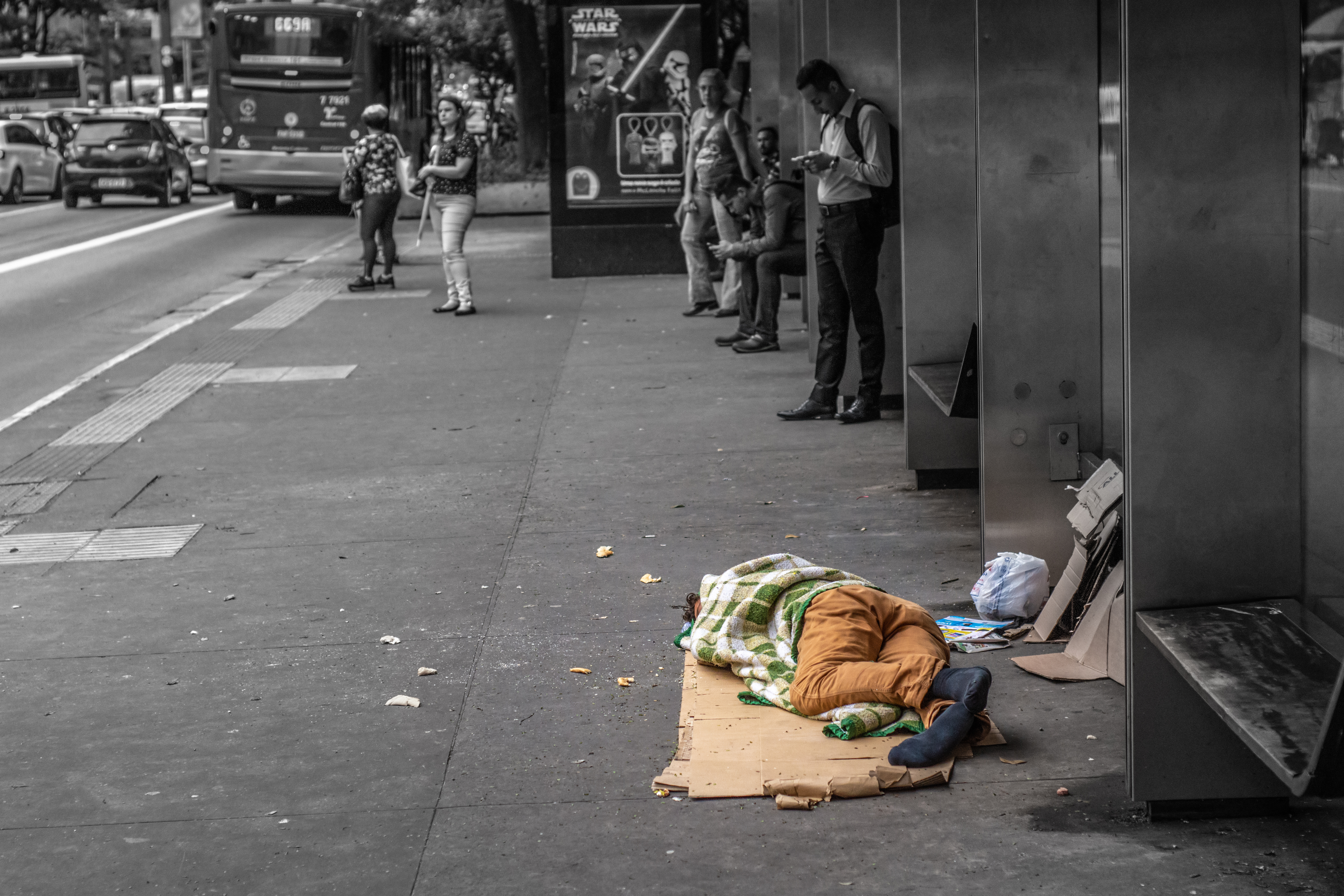
Homeless sleeping on Paulista Avenue, São Paulo, Brazil

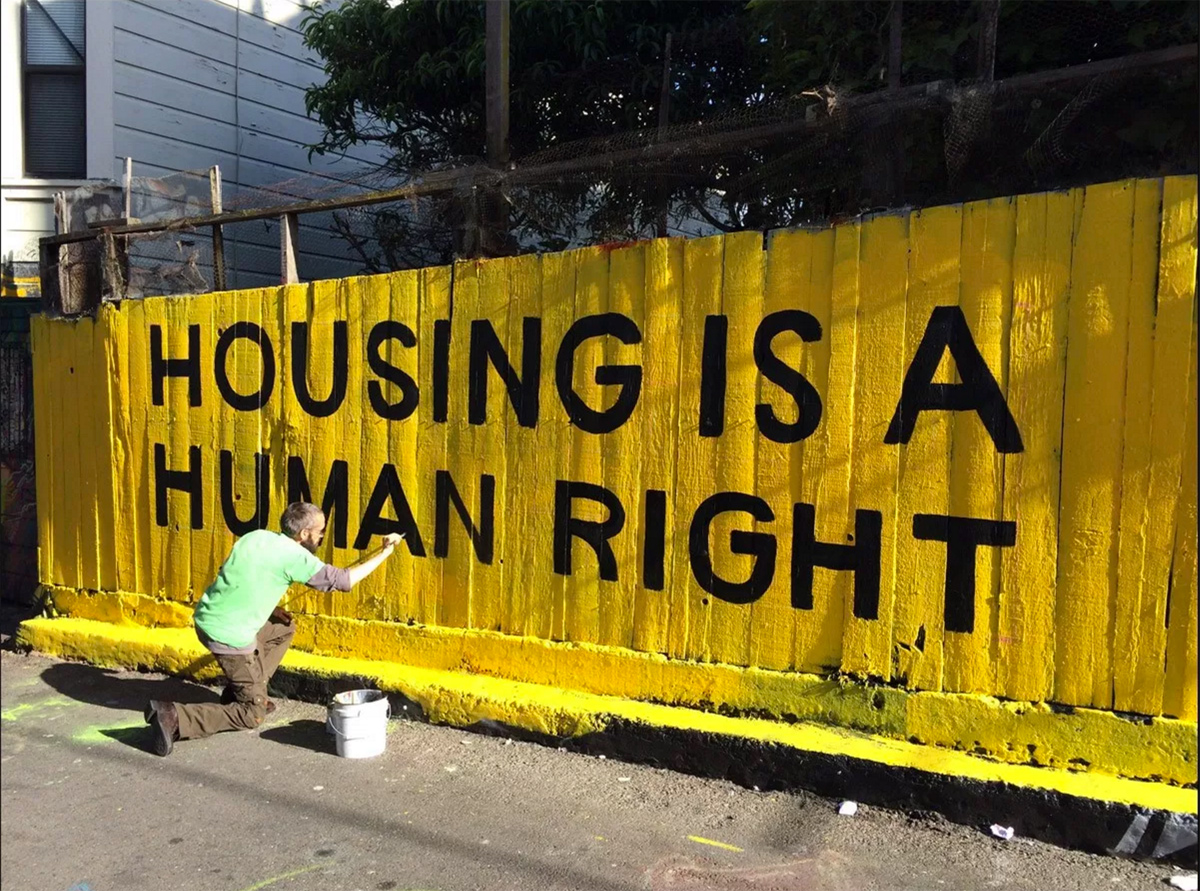
"Housing Is A Human Right"

Article 25 of the Universal Declaration of Human Rights recognizes the right to housing.

It states that:

Everyone has the right to a standard of living adequate for the health and well-being of himself and of his family, including food, clothing, housing and medical care and necessary social services, and the right to security in the event of unemployment, sickness, disability, widowhood, old age or other lack of livelihood in circumstances beyond his control.

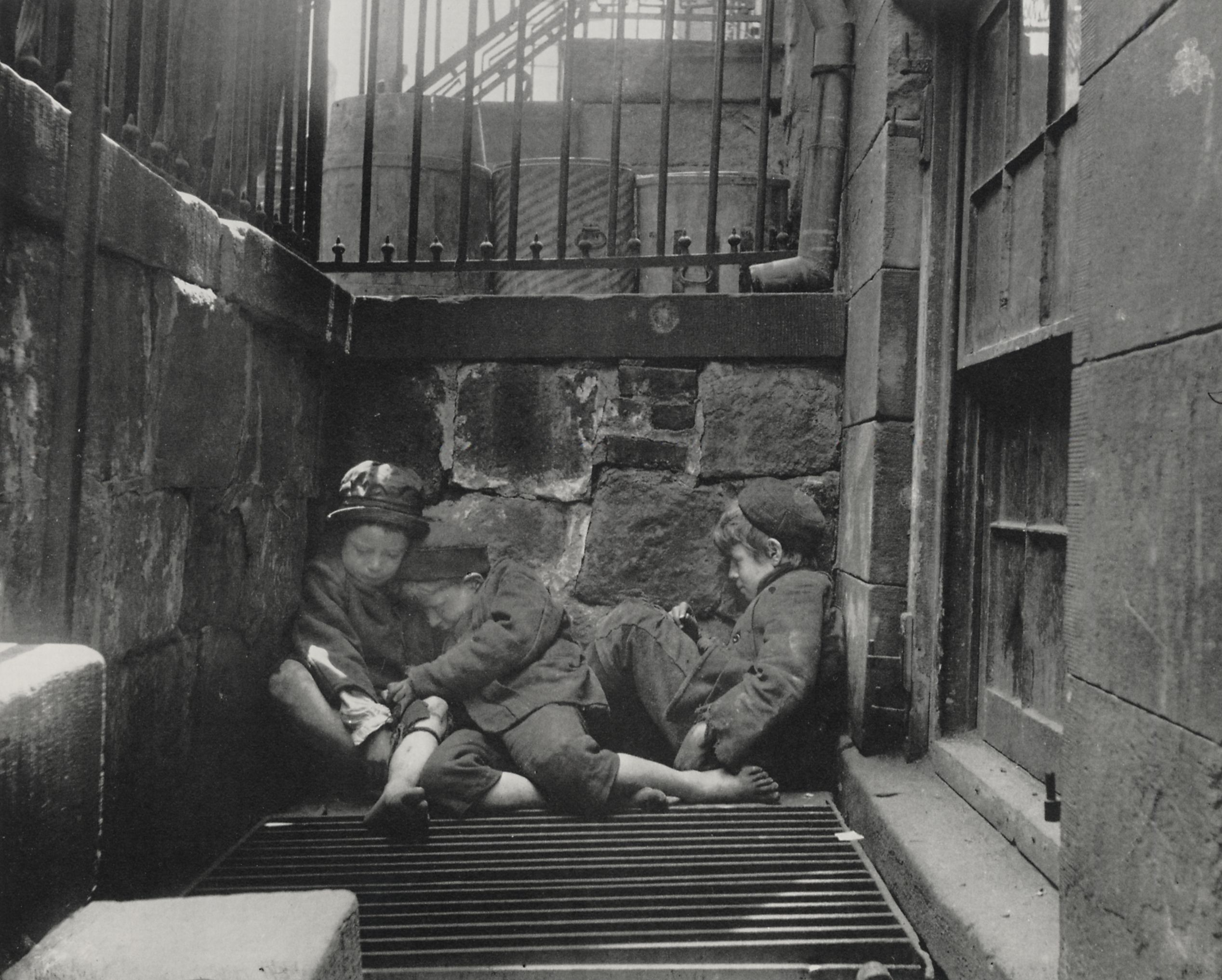
Sleeping, homeless children in early 20th-century New York City taken by Jacob Riis

In international human rights law the right to housing is regarded as a freestanding right. This was clarified in the 1991 General Comment no 4 on Adequate Housing by the UN Committee on Economic, Social and Cultural Rights.

The Yogyakarta Principles on the application of international human rights law in relation to sexual orientation and gender identity affirm that:

Everyone has the right to adequate housing, including protection from eviction, without discrimination and that States shall a) take all necessary legislative, administrative and other measures to ensure security of tenure and access to affordable, habitable, accessible, culturally appropriate and safe housing, not including shelters and other emergency accommodation, without discrimination on the basis of sexual orientation, gender identity or material or family status; b) take all necessary legislative, administrative and other measures to prohibit the execution of evictions that are not in conformity with their international human rights obligations, and ensure that adequate and effective legal or other appropriate remedies are available to any person claiming that a right to protection against forced evictions has been violated or is under threat of violation, including the right to resettlement, which includes the right to alternative land of better or equal quality and to adequate housing, without discrimination.

The right to housing is also enshrined in Article 28 of the Convention on the Rights of Persons with Disabilities, Article 16 of the European Social Charter (Article 31 of the Revised European Social charter) and in the African Charter on Human and Peoples' Rights. According to UN Committee on Economic, Social and Cultural Rights, aspects of right to housing under ICESCR include: legal security of tenure; availability of services, materials, facilities and infrastructure; affordability; habitability; accessibility; location and cultural adequacy.

Core components include:

- Legal security of tenure: "all persons should possess a degree of security of tenure which guarantees legal protection against forced eviction, harassment and other threats" whether owner-occupied, rental, cooperative, or informal.
- Availability of services, materials, facilities and infrastructure: must include access to safe drinking water, heating and lighting, sanitation and washing facilities, food storage, refuse disposal, and emergency services.
- Affordability: Housing costs should not threaten or compromise the attainment of other basic needs. States should establish housing subsidies for those unable to afford housing.
- Habitability: must provide adequate space and protection from cold, damp, heat, rain, wind, and other threats to health, structural hazards, and disease vectors.
- Accessibility: must be accessible to those entitled to it, with disadvantaged groups accorded full and sustainable access.
- Location: Must allow access to employment, health-care services, schools, child-care centers, and other and social facilities. Should not be polluted or require excessive commute.
- Cultural adequacy: The construction method and building materials must enable the expression of cultural identity and diversity.

== History ==
As a political goal, right to housing was declared in F. D. Roosevelt's 1944 speech on the Second Bill of Rights.

The 1948 Universal Declaration of Human Rights elevated housing to an internationally recognized right. The International Covenant on Economic, Social and Cultural Rights (ICESCR), article 11(1) also guarantees the right to housing codified in a binding treaty in 1966 that was enforced in 1976.

== UN Habitat ==
The simplified logo of UN Habitat

The right to adequate housing was a main theme in the Istanbul Agreement and Habitat Agenda. This includes a rule to "promote, protect and ensure the full and progressive realisation of the right to adequate housing" in Paragraph 61. The UN Human Settlement Programme was created during 2001. The programme is the most important international forum for the right to housing.

== Implementations ==
=== South Africa ===
In South Africa, section 26 of Chapter Two of the Constitution establishes that "everyone has the right to have access to adequate housing". The Department of Human Settlements is tasked with implementing this mandate. Based on recent data, around 3.6 million South Africans still live in shacks or informal settlements (2013 data), while it is estimated that around 200,000 are homeless or living on the streets (2015 data).

South Africa's Constitutional Court made the right to housing enforceable in the Grootboom case (2000), which found that the government's housing programme was unreasonable because it did not do enough for people in desperate need. The court ordered that the programme progressively realize the right of access to adequate housing within available resources.

Based on a survey of human rights experts administered by the Human Rights Measurement Initiative in 2019, South Africa is doing only 69.6% of what should be possible at its level of income on the right to housing.

=== United States ===
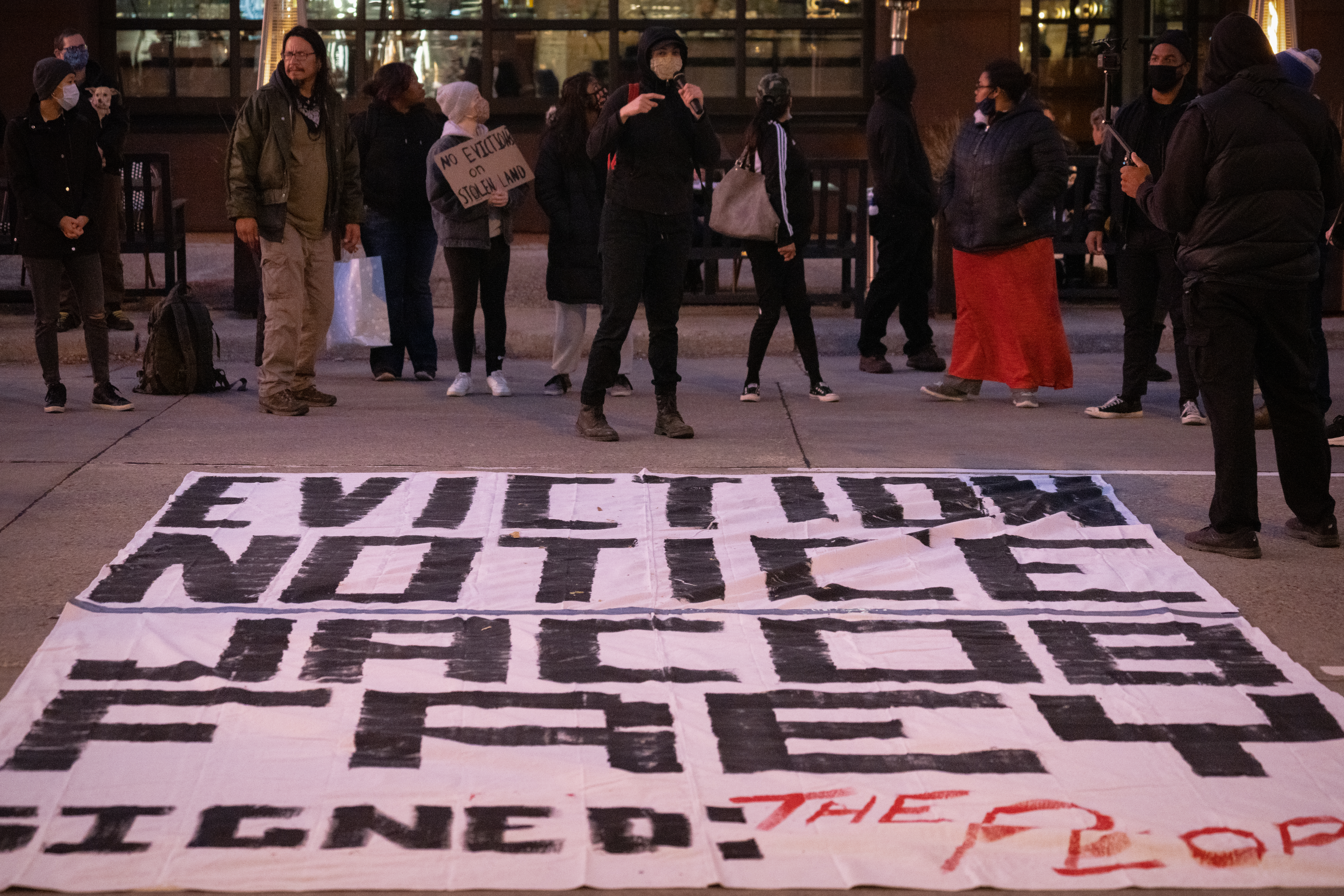
2020 protest against evictions in Minneapolis, Minnesota

No federal laws protect a right to adequate housing. The Supreme Court declined to recognize housing as a fundamental right protected under the Equal Protection Clause in Lindsey v. Normet (1972). Right to housing was a part of President Franklin Roosevelt's proposed Second Bill of Rights.

Most jurisdictions in the United States have no right to shelter. One exception is Massachusetts, where families (but not homeless individuals) do have the right to shelter. In California, runaway children have the right to be admitted to emergency shelters without parental consent. New York City also recognizes a right to emergency shelter, established in the 1981 consent decree for Callahan v. Carey.

=== Nigeria ===
The right to housing is recognized in the 1999 constitution, specifically in section 43 which states that "every citizen of Nigeria shall have the right to acquire and own immovable property anywhere in Nigeria". It further stated in section 44 that 'no movable property or any interest in immovable property shall be taken possession of compulsorily and no right over or interest in any such property shall be acquired compulsorily in any part of Nigeria except in the manner and for purposes prescribed by law that, among other things: requires the prompt payment of compensation and ensures parties access to the court for the determination of his interest in the property and the amount of compensation payable". The provisions of Section 16(2)(d) of the constitution in the Fundamental Objectives and Directive Principles of State Policy, which states that "the state shall direct its policy towards ensuring that suitable and adequate shelter is provided for all citizens" implies the recognition of the need to provide shelter for citizens but such right excludes right to adequate housing. Additionally, Section 6(6) (c) of the constitution declared the Fundamental Objectives and Directive Principles non-justiciable.

The housing conditions of people in Nigeria falls short of the international human rights law and standards, particularly vulnerable groups such as women, indigenous people, LGBTQ, internally displaced persons and people living with disability (PLW) in the rural settings of Abuja, Lagos and Port Harcourt. In 2014, WHO and UNICEF stated that 69% of the urban population of Nigeria were living in 'slums' without basic amenities like potable water, sanitation services, electricity, garbage collection, and paved roads. Also, the 2013 Nigerian Demographic and Health Survey revealed that 57 million and 130 million Nigerians had no access to safe water and adequate sanitation respectively. According to the Federal Mortgage Bank of Nigeria, there was a deficit of 22 million housing units in 2019. The Lagos state government stated that the housing deficit in the state is at 2.5 million units, with 70 percent of its total population living in informal housing. There is a 20 percent yearly housing demand increase in Abuja, Ibadan and Kano. Generally, private market housing can only be affordable by a few. There is scarce rental housing which demand tenants to have advance rent of more than one year. Rent control or caps are not given attention in addition to landlord–tenant relations, with regulation laws poorly enforced.

Based on a survey of human rights experts administered by the Human Rights Measurement Initiative in 2019, Nigeria is doing only 35.5% of what should be possible at its level of income on the right to housing.

=== Spain ===
In Spain's 1978 constitution, in section 47, it recognizes the right to housing. Spain put a housing law in place to protect this right. The Housing Law was approved in 2023, which made reforms aimed at providing affordable housing as well as rental protections to citizens. One piece of the law intended to regulate rental prices in 'stressed areas', which are places where the average rent exceeds the average household income. The Housing Law also tries to prevent landlords from bringing in fees that were not agreed to in a housing contract. However, there has been some controversy in Spain's implementation of the right to housing, since it has had at least one case taken to the United Nations about possible violations.

=== Finland ===
Finland launched a Housing First policy in 2008, with rough sleeping nearly eliminated in Helsinki. Under this approach, people experiencing homelessness are given a secure foundation of housing with support services provided alongside. The "Name on the Door" program reduced homelessness by 35% by 2015.

=== India ===
In Olga Tellis v. Bombay Municipal Corporation, the Supreme Court of India held that the right to life included the right to livelihood. Pavement dwellers had a conditional social rights meaning having an individual right only if a State scheme existed promising shelter to a group of people.

=== Canada ===
In Quebec (and elsewhere in Canada), the right to adequate housing is not explicitly preserved in the *Charter of Human Rights and Freedoms*, or the *Canadian Charter of Rights and Freedoms*. The *États généraux du travail social* (General Assembly on Social Work) recommended including a right to housing in the Quebec Charter. While a "right to remain in the premises" does exist under the *Civil Code of Quebec*, this right concerns the continued occupancy of those who already have housing and prevents arbitrary eviction for reasons not authorized by law.

== See also ==
- Civil Rights Act of 1968 – U.S. legislation which includes the Fair Housing Act
- Dahiya doctrine
- Housing Benefit
- Housing estate
- Housing First
- Housing crisis
- Public housing
- Section 8
- Subsidized housing
- Tenants unions
