= Giuseppe Palmisano =

Italian lawyer (born 1963)

Giuseppe Palmisano (born 19 April 1963) is an Italian lawyer.

In 1987 he graduated in law at the University of Rome La Sapienza. In 1992 he completed a PhD in international law at the University of Milan.

From 1989 to 1996 he worked as an assistant to the Special Rapporteur on State Responsibility (Professor Gaetano Arangio-Ruiz) at the International Law Commission of the United Nations.

From 2000 to 2002 he was an associate professor in EU law, from 2002 to 2011 a professor of international law, from 2004 to 2008 also a director of the Department of Legal and Political Studies at the University of Camerino.

From 2004 to 2014 he was a professor of international law and organization in the Course of Advanced Studies in International Relations in Rome.

From 2012 he is a director of the Institute for International Legal Studies of the National Research Council of Italy.

From 2011 he is a member of the European Committee of Social Rights, in 2015–2020 he was the president of the European Committee of Social Rights, from 2021 the General Rapporteur of the Committee.
