= Right to an adequate standard of living =

Fundamental human right

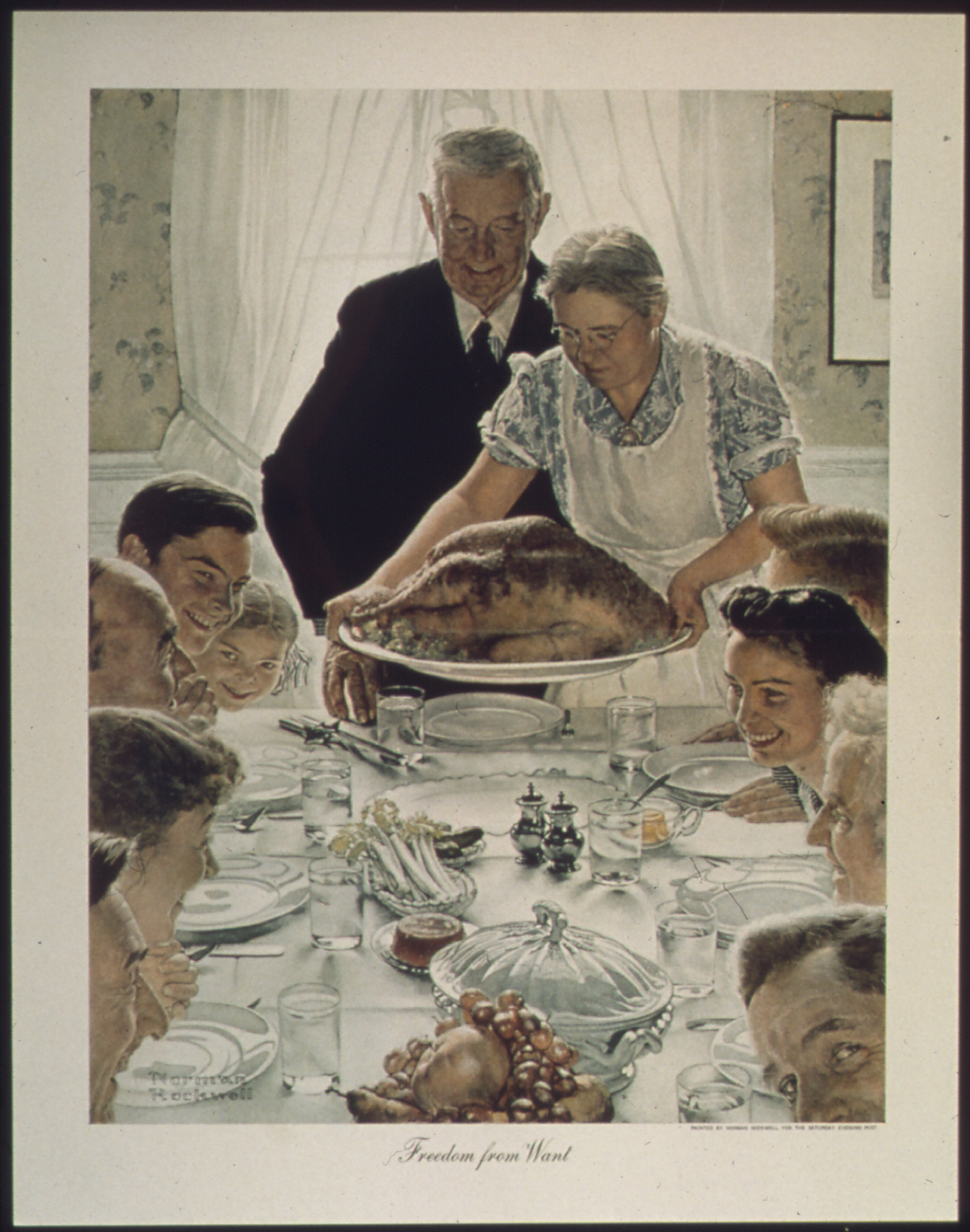
Freedom from Want (1943) by painter Norman Rockwell

The right to an adequate standard of living is listed as part of the Universal Declaration of Human Rights that was accepted by the General Assembly of the United Nations on December 10, 1948.

Everyone has the right to a standard of living adequate for the health and well-being of himself and of his family, including food, clothing, housing and medical care and necessary social services, and the right to security in the event of unemployment, sickness, disability, widowhood, old age or other lack of livelihood in circumstances beyond his control.

— Article 25.1 of the Universal Declaration of Human Rights

The right to an adequate standard of living can be linked to both article 1 and 22 of the Universal Declaration of Human Rights

"All human beings are born free and equal in dignity and rights."

— Article 1 of the Universal Declaration of Human Rights

"Everyone, as a member of society, has the right to social security and is entitled to realization, through national effort and international co-operation and in accordance with the organization and resources of each State, of the economic, social and cultural rights indispensable for his dignity and the free development of his personality."

— Article 22 of the Universal Declaration of Human Rights

Furthermore, it has been written down in article 11 of the United Nations' International Covenant on Economic, Social and Cultural Rights.

The predecessor of this right, the Freedom from Want, is one of the Four Freedoms that American President Franklin D. Roosevelt spoke of at his State of the Union of January 6, 1941. According to Roosevelt it is a right every human being everywhere in the world should have. Roosevelt described the third right as follows:

The third is freedom from want which, translated into world terms, means economic understandings which will secure to every nation a healthy peacetime life for its inhabitants, everywhere in the world.

— President Franklin D. Roosevelt, January 6, 1941.

== Economic perspectives ==
Economists, libertarians, and classical liberals have raised several objections to the concept of a right to an adequate standard of living, particularly when understood as imposing positive obligation on the state to provide resources or services.

Robert Nozick argued in Anarchy, State, and Utopia (1974) that redistributive taxation to achieve patterned distributions of wealth (including guarantees of minimum living standards) violates individuals' entitlements to their justly acquired holdings. Under his entitlement theory of justice, once property has been acquired through just means and transferred voluntarily, any forced redistribution constitutes a violations of rights, akin to forced labor.

Critics further contend that positive rights of this kind conflict with traditional negative liberties (freedoms from interference). Enforcing a right to housing, food, or social services requires compelling some individuals to provide for others, thereby infringing on property rights and freedom of association. Friedrich Hayek warned that expansive welfare commitments tend to increase state power and central planning, eroding the rule of law and individual liberty.

== See also ==
- Economic, social and cultural rights
- Human right to water and sanitation
