= International Covenant on Economic, Social and Cultural Rights =

Covenant adopted in 1966 by United Nations General Assembly resolution

- Parties and signatories to the ICESCR: signed and ratified signed but not ratified neither signed nor ratified
- Type: United Nations General Assembly Resolution
- Drafted: 1954
- Signed: 16 December 1966
- Location: United Nations Headquarters, New York City
- Effective: 3 January 1976
- Signatories: 72
- Parties: 174
- Depositary: Secretary-General of the United Nations
- Languages: French, English, Russian, Chinese and Spanish (authentic texts pursuant to Article 31 of the Covenant), as well as Arabic (official text adopted by the UN General Assembly)

Full text at Wikisource
- International Covenant on Economic, Social and Cultural Rights

ECOSOC Resolution 2007/25: Support to non-self-governing territories by the specialized agencies and international institutions associated with the United Nations (26 July 2007)

The International Covenant on Economic, Social and Cultural Rights (ICESCR) is a multilateral treaty adopted by the United Nations General Assembly (GA) on 16 December 1966 through GA. Resolution 2200A (XXI), and came into force on 3 January 1976. It commits its parties to work toward the granting of economic, social, and cultural rights (ESCR) to all individuals including those living in Non-Self-Governing and Trust Territories. The rights include labour rights, the right to health, the right to education, and the right to an adequate standard of living. As of November 2026, the Covenant has 174 parties. A further four countries, including the United States, have signed but not ratified the Covenant.

The ICESCR (and its Optional Protocol) is part of the International Bill of Human Rights, along with the Universal Declaration of Human Rights (UDHR) and the International Covenant on Civil and Political Rights (ICCPR), including the latter's first and second Optional Protocols.

The Covenant is monitored by the UN Committee on Economic, Social and Cultural Rights.

== Genesis ==
The ICESCR has its roots in the same process that led to the Universal Declaration of Human Rights. A "Declaration on the Essential Rights of Man" had been proposed at the 1945 San Francisco Conference which led to the founding of the United Nations, and the Economic and Social Council was given the task of drafting it. Early on in the process, the document was split into a declaration setting forth general principles of human rights, and a convention or covenant containing binding commitments. The former evolved into the UDHR and was adopted on 10 December 1948.

Drafting continued on the convention, but there remained significant differences between UN members on the relative importance of negative civil and political versus positive economic, social and cultural rights. These eventually caused the convention to be split into two separate covenants, "one to contain civil and political rights and the other to contain economic, social and cultural rights." The two covenants were to contain as many similar provisions as possible and be opened for signature simultaneously. Each would also contain an article on the right of all peoples to self-determination.

The first document became the International Covenant on Civil and Political Rights, and the second the International Covenant on Economic, Social and Cultural Rights. The drafts were presented to the UN General Assembly for discussion in 1954 and adopted in 1966.

== Summary ==
The Covenant follows the structure of the UDHR and the ICCPR, with a preamble and thirty-one articles, divided into five parts.

Part 1 (Article 1) recognises the right of all peoples to self-determination, including the right to "freely determine their political status", pursue their economic, social and cultural goals, and manage and dispose of their own resources. It recognises a negative right of a people not to be deprived of its means of subsistence, and imposes an obligation on those parties still responsible for non-self governing and trust territories (colonies) to encourage and respect their self-determination.

Part 2 (Articles 2–5) establishes the principle of "progressive realisation" (see below.) It also requires the rights be recognised "without discrimination of any kind as to race, colour, sex, language, religion, political or other opinion, national or social origin, property, birth or other status". The rights can only be limited by law, in a manner compatible with the nature of the rights, and only for the purpose of "promoting the general welfare in a democratic society".

Part 3 (Articles 6–15) lists the rights themselves. These include rights to

- work, under "just and favourable conditions", with the right to form and join trade unions (Articles 6, 7, and 8);
- social security, including social insurance (Article 9);
- family life, including paid parental leave and the protection of children (Article 10);
- an adequate standard of living, including adequate food, clothing and housing, and the "continuous improvement of living conditions" (Article 11);
- health, specifically "the highest attainable standard of physical and mental health" (Article 12);
- education, including free universal primary education, generally available secondary education and equally accessible higher education. This should be directed to "the full development of the human personality and the sense of its dignity", and enable all persons to participate effectively in society (Articles 13 and 14);
- participation in cultural life (Article 15).

As negative and positive rights are rights that oblige either action (positive rights) or inaction (negative rights), many of these aforementioned rights include specific actions which must be undertaken to realise them, as they are positive economic, social and cultural rights that go beyond relatively inaction-based civil and political negative rights.

Part 4 (Articles 16–25) governs reporting and monitoring of the Covenant and the steps taken by the parties to implement it. It also allows the monitoring body – originally the United Nations Economic and Social Council – now the Committee on Economic, Social and Cultural Rights – see below – to make general recommendations to the UN General Assembly on appropriate measures to realise the rights (Article 21)

Part 5 (Articles 26–31) governs ratification, entry into force, and amendment of the Covenant.

== Core provisions ==
=== Principle of progressive realisation ===
Article 2 of the Covenant imposes a duty on all parties to

take steps... to the maximum of its available resources, with a view to achieving progressively the full realization of the rights recognized in the present Covenant by all appropriate means, including particularly the adoption of legislative measures.

This is known as the principle of "progressive realisation". It acknowledges that some of the rights (for example, the right to health) may be difficult in practice to achieve in a short period of time, and that states may be subject to resource constraints, but requires them to act as best they can within their means.

The principle differs from that of the ICCPR, which obliges parties to "respect and to ensure to all individuals within its territory and subject to its jurisdiction" the rights in that Convention. However, it does not render the Covenant meaningless. The requirement to "take steps" imposes a continuing obligation to work towards the realisation of the rights. It also rules out deliberately regressive measures which impede that goal. The Committee on Economic, Social and Cultural Rights also interprets the principle as imposing minimum core obligations to provide, at the least, minimum essential levels of each of the rights. If resources are highly constrained, this should include the use of targeted programmes aimed at the vulnerable.

The Committee on Economic, Social and Cultural Rights regards legislation as an indispensable means for realizing the rights which is unlikely to be limited by resource constraints. The enacting of anti-discrimination provisions and the establishment of enforceable rights with judicial remedies within national legal systems are considered to be appropriate means. Some provisions, such as anti-discrimination laws, are already required under other human rights instruments, such as the ICCPR.

=== Labour rights ===
Article 6 of the Covenant recognizes the right to work as defined by the opportunity of everyone to gain a means of sustenance by means of freely chosen or accepted work. Parties are required to take "appropriate steps" to safeguard this right, including technical and vocational training and economic policies aimed at steady economic development, and ultimately full employment. The right implies parties must guarantee equal access to employment and protect workers from being unfairly deprived of employment. They must prevent discrimination in the workplace and ensure access for the disadvantaged. The fact that work must be freely chosen or accepted means parties must prohibit forced or child labour.

The work referred to in Article 6 must be decent work. This is effectively defined by Article 7 of the Covenant, which recognises the right of everyone to "just and favourable" working conditions. These are in turn defined as fair wages with equal pay for equal work, sufficient to provide a decent living for workers and their dependants; safe working conditions; equal opportunity in the workplace; and sufficient rest and leisure, including limited working hours and regular, paid holidays.

Article 8 recognises the right of workers to form or join trade unions and protects the right to strike. However, it allows these rights to be restricted for members of the armed forces, police, or government administrators. Several parties have placed reservations on this clause, allowing it to be interpreted in a manner consistent with their constitutions (e.g., China, Mexico), or extending the restriction of union rights to groups such as firefighters (e.g., Japan).

=== Right to social security ===
Article 9 of the Covenant recognises "the right of everyone to social security, including social insurance". It requires parties to provide some form of social insurance scheme to protect people against the risks of sickness, disability, maternity, employment injury, unemployment or old age; to provide for survivors, orphans, and those who cannot afford health care; and to ensure that families are adequately supported. Benefits from such a scheme must be adequate, accessible to all, and provided without discrimination. The Covenant does not restrict the form of the scheme, and both contributory and non-contributory schemes are permissible (as are community-based and mutual schemes).

The Committee on Economic, Social and Cultural Rights has noted persistent problems with the implementation of this right, with very low levels of access.

Several parties, including France and Monaco, have reservations allowing them to set residence requirements in order to qualify for social benefits. The Committee on Economic, Social and Cultural Rights permits such restrictions, provided they are proportionate and reasonable.

=== Right to family life ===
Article 10 of the Covenant recognises the family as "the natural and fundamental group unit of society", and requires parties to accord it "the widest possible protection and assistance". Parties must ensure that their citizens are free to establish families and that marriages are freely contracted and not forced. Parties must also provide paid leave or adequate social security to mothers before and after childbirth, an obligation which overlaps with that of Article 9. Finally, parties must take "special measures" to protect children from economic or social exploitation, including setting a minimum age of employment and barring children from dangerous and harmful occupations.

=== Right to an adequate standard of living ===
Article 11 recognises the right to an adequate standard of living. This includes, but is not limited to, the right to adequate food, clothing, housing, and "the continuous improvement of living conditions". It also creates an obligation on parties to work together to eliminate world hunger.

The right to adequate food, also referred to as the right to food, is interpreted as requiring "the availability of food in a quantity and quality sufficient to satisfy the dietary needs of individuals, free from adverse substances, and acceptable within a given culture". This must be accessible to all, implying an obligation to provide special programmes for the vulnerable. This must also ensure an equitable distribution of world food supplies in relation to need, taking into account the problems of food-importing and food-exporting countries. The right to adequate food also implies a right to water.

The right to adequate housing, also referred to as the right to housing, is "the right to live somewhere in security, peace and dignity." It requires "adequate privacy, adequate space, adequate security, adequate lighting and ventilation, adequate basic infrastructure and adequate location with regard to work and basic facilities – all at a reasonable cost." Parties must ensure security of tenure and that access is free of discrimination, and progressively work to eliminate homelessness. Forced evictions, defined as "the permanent or temporary removal against their will of individuals, families and/or communities from the homes and/or land which they occupy, without the provision of, and access to, appropriate forms of legal or other protection," are a prima facie violation of the Covenant.

The right to adequate clothing, also referred to as the right to clothing, has not been authoritatively defined and has received little in the way of academic commentary or international discussion. What is considered "adequate" has only been discussed in specific contexts, such as refugees, the disabled, the elderly, or workers.

=== Right to health ===
Article 12 of the Covenant recognises the right of everyone to "the enjoyment of the highest attainable standard of physical and mental health". "Health" is understood not just as a right to be healthy, but as a right to control one's own health and body (including reproduction), and be free from interference such as torture or medical experimentation. States must protect this right by ensuring that everyone within their jurisdiction has access to the underlying determinants of health, such as clean water, sanitation, food, nutrition and housing, and through a comprehensive system of healthcare, which is available to everyone without discrimination, and economically accessible to all.

Article 12.2 requires parties to take specific steps to improve the health of their citizens, including reducing infant mortality and improving child health, improving environmental and workplace health, preventing, controlling and treating epidemic diseases, and creating conditions to ensure equal and timely access to medical services for all. These are considered to be "illustrative, non-exhaustive examples", rather than a complete statement of parties' obligations.

The right to health is interpreted as requiring parties to respect women's reproductive rights, by not limiting access to contraception or "censoring, withholding or intentionally misrepresenting" information about sexual health. They must also ensure that women are protected from harmful traditional practices such as female genital mutilation.

The right to health is an inclusive right extending not only to timely and appropriate health care, but also to the underlying determinants of health, such as access to safe and potable water and adequate sanitation, an adequate supply of safe food, nutrition and housing, healthy occupational and environmental conditions.

=== Right to free education ===
Article 13 of the Covenant recognises the right of everyone to free education (free for the primary level only, and "the progressive introduction of free education" for the secondary and higher levels). This is to be directed towards "the full development of the human personality and the sense of its dignity", and enable all persons to participate effectively in society. Education is seen both as a human right and as "an indispensable means of realizing other human rights", and so this is one of the longest and most important articles of the Covenant.

Article 13.2 lists a number of specific steps parties are required to pursue to realise the right of education. These include the provision of free, universal and compulsory primary education, "generally available and accessible" secondary education in various forms (including technical and vocational training), and equally accessible higher education. All of these must be available to all without discrimination. Parties must also develop a school system (though it may be public, private, or mixed), encourage or provide scholarships for disadvantaged groups. Parties are required to make education free at all levels, either immediately or progressively; "[p]rimary education shall be compulsory and available free to all"; secondary education "shall be made generally available and accessible to all by every appropriate means, and in particular by the progressive introduction of free education"; and "[h]igher education shall be made equally accessible to all, on the basis of capacity, by every appropriate means, and in particular by the progressive introduction of free education".

Articles 13.3 and 13.4 require parties to respect the educational freedom of parents by allowing them to choose and establish private educational institutions for their children, also referred to as freedom of education. They also recognise the right of parents to "ensure the religious and moral education of their children in conformity with their own convictions". This is interpreted as requiring public schools to respect the freedom of religion and conscience of their students, and as forbidding instruction in a particular religion or belief system unless non-discriminatory exemptions and alternatives are available.

The Committee on Economic, Social and Cultural Rights interpret the Covenant as also requiring states to respect the academic freedom of staff and students, as this is vital for the educational process. It also considers corporal punishment in schools to be inconsistent with the Covenant's underlying principle of the dignity of the individual.

Article 14 of the Covenant requires those parties which have not yet established a system of free compulsory primary education to rapidly adopt a detailed plan of action for its introduction "within a reasonable number of years".

=== Right to participation in cultural life ===
Article 15 of the Covenant recognises the right of everyone to participate in cultural life, enjoy the benefits of scientific progress, and to benefit from the protection of the moral and material rights to any scientific discovery or artistic work they have created. The latter clause is sometimes seen as requiring the protection of intellectual property, but the Committee on Economic, Social and Cultural Rights interprets it as primarily protecting the moral rights of authors and "proclaim[ing] the intrinsically personal character of every creation of the human mind and the ensuing durable link between creators and their creations". It thus requires parties to respect the right of authors to be recognised as the creator of a work. The material rights are interpreted as being part of the right to an adequate standard of living, and "need not extend over the entire lifespan of an author."

Parties must also work to promote the conservation, development and diffusion of science and culture, "respect the freedom indispensable for scientific research and creative activity", and encourage international contacts and cooperation in these fields.

== Reservations ==
A number of parties have made reservations and interpretative declarations to their application of the Covenant.

Algeria interprets parts of Article 13, protecting the liberty of parents to freely choose or establish suitable educational institutions, so as not to "impair its right freely to organize its educational system."

Bangladesh interprets the self-determination clause in Article 1 as applying in the historical context of colonialism. It also reserves the right to interpret the labour rights in Articles 7 and 8 and the non-discrimination clauses of Articles 2 and 3 within the context of its constitution and domestic law.

Belgium interprets non-discrimination as to national origin as "not necessarily implying an obligation on States automatically to guarantee to foreigners the same rights as to their nationals. The term should be understood to refer to the elimination of any arbitrary behaviour but not of differences in treatment based on objective and reasonable considerations, in conformity with the principles prevailing in democratic societies."

China restricts labour rights in Article 8 in a manner consistent with its constitution and domestic law.

Egypt accepts the Covenant only to the extent it does not conflict with Islamic Sharia law. Sharia is "a primary source of legislation" under Article 2 of both the suspended 1973 Constitution and the 2011 Provisional Constitutional Declaration.

France views the Covenant as subservient to the UN Charter. It also reserves the right to govern the access of aliens to employment, social security, and other benefits.

India interprets the right of self-determination as applying "only to the peoples under foreign domination" and not to apply to peoples within sovereign nation-states. It also interprets the limitation of rights clause and the rights of equal opportunity in the workplace within the context of its constitution.

Indonesia interprets the self-determination clause (Article 1) within the context of other international law and as not applying to peoples within a sovereign nation-state.

Ireland reserves the right to promote the Irish language.

Japan reserved the right not to be bound to progressively introduce free secondary and higher education, the right to strike for public servant and the remuneration on public holidays.

Kuwait interprets the non-discrimination clauses of Articles 2 and 3 within its constitution and laws, and reserves the right to social security to apply only to Kuwaitis. It also reserves the right to forbid strikes.

Mexico restricts the labour rights of Article 8 within the context of its constitution and laws.

Monaco interprets the principle of non-discrimination on the grounds of national origin as "not necessarily implying an automatic obligation on the part of States to guarantee foreigners the same rights as their nationals", and reserves the right to set residence requirements on the rights to work, health, education, and social security.

Myanmar has a general reservation to interpret "the right of self-determination" to not interfere with the established government or authorize any action to undermine the government. Additionally, the term does not apply to Section 10 of the Constitution of the Republic of the Union of Myanmar, 2008. Section 10 reads: "no part of the territory constituted in the union such as regions, states, union territories, and self-administered areas shall ever secede from the Union."

New Zealand reserved the right not to apply Article 8 (the right to form and join trade unions) insofar as existing measures (which at the time included compulsory unionism and encouraged arbitration of disputes) were incompatible with it.

Norway reserves the right to strike so as to allow for compulsory arbitration of some labour disputes.

Pakistan has a general reservation to interpret the Covenant within the framework of its constitution.

Thailand interprets the right to self-determination within the framework of other international law.

Trinidad and Tobago reserves the right to restrict the right to strike of those engaged in essential occupations.

Turkey will implement the Covenant subject to the UN Charter. It also reserves the right to interpret and implement the right of parents to choose and establish educational institutions in a manner compatible with its constitution.

United Kingdom views the Covenant as subservient to the UN Charter. It made several reservations regarding its overseas territories.

United States – Amnesty International writes that "The United States signed the Covenant in 1979 under the Carter administration but is not fully bound by it until it is ratified. For political reasons, the Carter administration did not push for the necessary review of the Covenant by the Senate, which must give its 'advice and consent' before the US can ratify a treaty. The Reagan and George H.W. Bush administrations took the view that economic, social, and cultural rights were not really rights but merely desirable social goals and therefore should not be the object of binding treaties. The Clinton Administration did not deny the nature of these rights but did not find it politically expedient to engage in a battle with Congress over the Covenant. The George W. Bush administration followed in line with the view of the previous Bush administration." The Obama Administration stated "The Administration does not seek action at this time" on the Covenant. The Heritage Foundation, a conservative think tank, argues that signing it would oblige the introduction of policies that it opposes such as universal health care.

== Optional Protocol ==
states parties states that signed, but have not ratified states that have not signed

The Optional Protocol to the International Covenant on Economic, Social and Cultural Rights is a side-agreement to the Covenant which allows its parties to recognise the competence of the Committee on Economic Social and Cultural Rights to consider complaints from individuals.

The Optional Protocol was adopted by the UN General Assembly on 10 December 2008. It was opened for signature on 24 September 2009, and as of December 2025 has been signed by 46 parties and ratified by 31. Having passed the threshold of required ratifications, it has entered into force on 5 May 2013.

== Committee on Economic, Social and Cultural Rights ==
The Committee on Economic, Social and Cultural Rights is a body of human rights experts tasked with monitoring the implementation of the Covenant. It consists of 18 independent human rights experts, elected for four-year terms, with half the members elected every two years.

Unlike other human rights monitoring bodies, the committee was not established by the treaty it oversees. Rather, it was established by the Economic and Social Council following the failure of two previous monitoring bodies.

All states parties are required to submit regular reports to the Committee outlining the legislative, judicial, policy and other measures they have taken to implement the rights affirmed in the Covenant. The first report is due within two years of ratifying the Covenant; thereafter reports are due every five years. The Committee examines each report and addresses its concerns and recommendations to the State party in the form of "concluding observations".

The Committee typically meets every May and November in Geneva.

== Parties to the covenant ==
The following are parties to the covenant:

State	Date signed	Date ratified, acceded or succeeded	Notes
Afghanistan		24 January 1983	
Albania		4 October 1991	
Algeria	10 December 1968	12 September 1989	
Andorra	23 September 2025	22 September 2026	
Angola		10 January 1992	
Antigua and Barbuda		3 July 2019	
Argentina	19 February 1968	8 August 1986	
Armenia		13 September 1993	
Australia	18 December 1972	10 December 1975	
Austria	10 December 1973	10 September 1978	
Azerbaijan		13 August 1992	
Bahamas	4 December 2008	23 December 2008	
Bahrain		27 September 2007	
Bangladesh		5 October 1998	
Barbados		5 January 1973	
Belarus	19 March 1968	12 November 1973	Signed and ratified as the Byelorussian Soviet Socialist Republic.
Belgium	10 December 1968	21 April 1983	
Belize	6 September 2000	9 March 2015	
Benin		12 March 1992	
Plurinational State of Bolivia		12 August 1982	
Bosnia and Herzegovina		1 September 1993	The former Yugoslavia had signed the Covenant on 8 August 1967 and ratified it on 2 June 1971.
Brazil		24 January 1992	
Bulgaria	8 October 1968	21 September 1970	
Burkina Faso		4 January 1999	
Burundi		9 May 1990	
Cambodia	17 October 1980	26 May 1992	Democratic Kampuchea had signed the Covenant on 17 October 1980
Cameroon		27 June 1984	
Canada		19 May 1976	
Cape Verde		6 August 1993	
Central African Republic		8 May 1981	
Chad		9 June 1995	
Chile	16 September 1969	10 February 1972	
China	27 October 1997	27 March 2001	The Republic of China had signed on 5 October 1967
Colombia	21 December 1966	29 October 1969	
Comoros	25 September 2008		
Congo		5 October 1983	
Costa Rica	19 December 1966	29 November 1968	
Côte d'Ivoire		26 March 1992	
Croatia		12 October 1992	The former Yugoslavia had signed the Covenant on 8 August 1967 and ratified it on 2 June 1971.
Cuba	28 February 2008		
Cyprus	9 January 1967	2 April 1969	
Czech Republic		22 February 1993	Czechoslovakia had signed the Covenant on 7 October 1968 and ratified it on 23 December 1975.
Democratic People's Republic of Korea		14 September 1981	
Democratic Republic of the Congo		1 November 1976	
Denmark	20 March 1968	6 January 1972	
Djibouti		5 November 2002	
Dominica		17 June 1993	
Dominican Republic		4 January 1978	
Ecuador	29 September 1967	6 March 1969	
Egypt	4 August 1967	14 January 1982	
El Salvador	21 September 1967	30 November 1979	
Equatorial Guinea		25 September 1987	
Eritrea		17 April 2001	
Estonia		21 October 1991	
Ethiopia		11 June 1993	
Finland	11 October 1967	19 August 1975	
Fiji		16 August 2018	
France		4 November 1980	
Gabon		21 January 1983	
Gambia		29 December 1978	
Georgia		3 May 1994	
Germany	9 October 1968	17 December 1973	The German Democratic Republic had signed and ratified the convention with reservations on 27 March 1973 and 8 November 1973
Ghana	7 September 2000	7 September 2000	
Greece		16 May 1985	
Grenada		6 September 1991	
Guatemala		19 May 1988	
Guinea	28 February 1967	24 January 1978	
Guinea-Bissau		2 July 1992	
Guyana	22 August 1968	15 February 1977	
Haiti		8 October 2013	
Honduras	19 December 1966	17 February 1981	
Hungary	25 March 1969	17 January 1974	
Iceland	30 December 1968	22 August 1979	
India		10 April 1979	
Indonesia		23 February 2006	
Iran (Islamic Republic of)	4 April 1968	24 June 1975	
Iraq	18 February 1969	25 January 1971	
Ireland	1 October 1973	8 December 1989	
Israel	19 December 1966	3 October 1991	
Italy	18 January 1967	15 September 1978	
Jamaica	19 December 1966	3 October 1975	
Japan	30 May 1978	21 June 1979	
Jordan	30 June 1972	28 May 1975	
Kazakhstan	2 December 2003	24 January 2006	
Kenya		1 May 1972	
Kuwait		21 May 1996	
Kyrgyzstan		7 October 1994	
Lao People's Democratic Republic	7 December 2000	13 February 2007	
Latvia		14 April 1992	
Lebanon		3 November 1972	
Lesotho		9 September 1992	
Liberia	18 April 1967	22 September 2004	
Libya		15 May 1970	
Liechtenstein		10 December 1998	
Lithuania		20 November 1991	
Luxembourg	26 November 1974	18 August 1983	
Madagascar	14 April 1970	22 September 1971	
Malawi		22 December 1993	
Maldives		19 September 2006	
Mali		16 July 1974	
Malta	22 October 1968	13 September 1990	
Marshall Islands		12 March 2018	
Mauritania		17 November 2004	
Mauritius		12 December 1973	
Mexico		23 March 1981	
Monaco	26 June 1997	28 August 1997	
Mongolia	5 June 1968	18 November 1974	
Montenegro		23 October 2006	
Morocco	19 January 1977	3 May 1979	
Myanmar	16 July 2015	6 October 2017	
Namibia		28 November 1994	
Nepal		14 May 1991	
Netherlands	25 June 1969	11 December 1978	
New Zealand	12 November 1968	28 December 1978	
Nicaragua		12 March 1980	
Niger		7 March 1986	
Nigeria		29 July 1993	
North Macedonia		18 January 1994	The former Yugoslavia had signed the Covenant on 8 August 1967 and ratified it on 2 June 1971.
Norway	20 March 1968	13 September 1972	
Oman		9 June 2020	
Pakistan	3 November 2004	17 April 2008	
Palau	20 September 2011		
State of Palestine		2 April 2014	
Panama	27 July 1976	8 March 1977	
Papua New Guinea		21 July 2008	
Paraguay		10 June 1992	
Peru	11 August 1977	28 April 1978	
Philippines	19 December 1966	7 June 1974	
Poland	2 March 1967	18 March 1977	
Portugal	7 October 1976	31 July 1978	
Qatar		21 May 2018	
Republic of Korea		10 April 1990	
Republic of Moldova		26 January 1993	
Romania	27 June 1968	9 December 1974	
Russian Federation	18 March 1968	16 October 1973	Signed and ratified as the Soviet Union.
Rwanda		16 April 1975	
San Marino		18 October 1985	
São Tomé and Príncipe	31 October 1995	10 January 2017	
Senegal	6 July 1970	13 February 1978	
Serbia		12 March 2001	The former Yugoslavia had signed the Covenant on 8 August 1967 and ratified it on 2 June 1971. The 2001 declaration of succession was made by the Federal Republic of Yugoslavia.
Seychelles		5 May 1992	
Sierra Leone		23 August 1996	
Slovakia		28 May 1993	Czechoslovakia had signed the Covenant on 7 October 1968 and ratified it on 23 December 1975.
Slovenia		6 July 1992	The former Yugoslavia had signed the Covenant on 8 August 1967 and ratified it on 2 June 1971.
Solomon Islands		17 March 1982	
Somalia		24 January 1990	
South Africa	3 October 1994	12 January 2015	
South Sudan		5 February 2024	
Spain	28 September 1976	27 April 1977	
Sri Lanka		11 June 1980	
St. Kitts and Nevis		1 November 2024	
St. Vincent and the Grenadines		9 November 1981	
Sudan		18 March 1986	
Suriname		28 December 1976	
Swaziland		26 March 2004	
Sweden	29 September 1967	6 December 1971	
Switzerland		18 June 1992	
Syrian Arab Republic		21 April 1969	
Tajikistan		4 January 1999	
Thailand		5 September 1999	
Timor-Leste		16 April 2003	
Togo		24 May 1984	
Trinidad and Tobago		8 December 1978	
Tunisia	30 April 1968	18 March 1969	
Turkey	15 August 2000	23 September 2003	
Turkmenistan		1 May 1997	
Uganda		21 January 1987	
Ukraine	20 March 1968	12 November 1973	Signed and ratified as the Ukrainian Soviet Socialist Republic.
United Kingdom of Great Britain and Northern Ireland	16 September 1968	20 May 1976	
United Republic of Tanzania		11 June 1976	
United States of America	5 October 1977		
Uruguay	21 February 1967	1 April 1970	
Uzbekistan		28 September 1995	
Venezuela (Bolivarian Republic of)	24 June 1969	10 May 1978	
Viet Nam		24 September 1982	
Yemen		9 February 1987	Effected as Yemen Arab Republic
Zambia		10 April 1984	
Zimbabwe		13 May 1991	

== States not members of the Covenant ==
=== Signed but not ratified ===
State	Signed
Comoros	25 September 2008
Cuba	28 February 2008
Palau	20 September 2011
United States of America	5 October 1977

=== Neither signed nor ratified ===
1. Botswana
2. Bhutan
3. Brunei
4. Kiribati
5. Malaysia
6. Federated States of Micronesia
7. Mozambique
8. Nauru
9. Samoa
10. Saudi Arabia
11. Singapore
12. St. Lucia
13. Tonga
14. Tuvalu
15. United Arab Emirates
16. Vanuatu

=== Non-members of the UN ===
1. Cook Islands
2. Niue
3. Taiwan (Note: The ROC lost its United Nations seat in 1971 (replaced as the representative of China by the People's Republic of China under Resolution 2758). The Republic of China government signed the Covenant in 1967 but did not ratify; in 2009 Taiwan (Republic of China) finally ratified it, but the deposit was rejected by the UN.)
4. Vatican City (through the Holy See) (Note: The Vatican is not a member of the United Nations though it holds observer status.)
