= Right to health =

Human right towards individual health

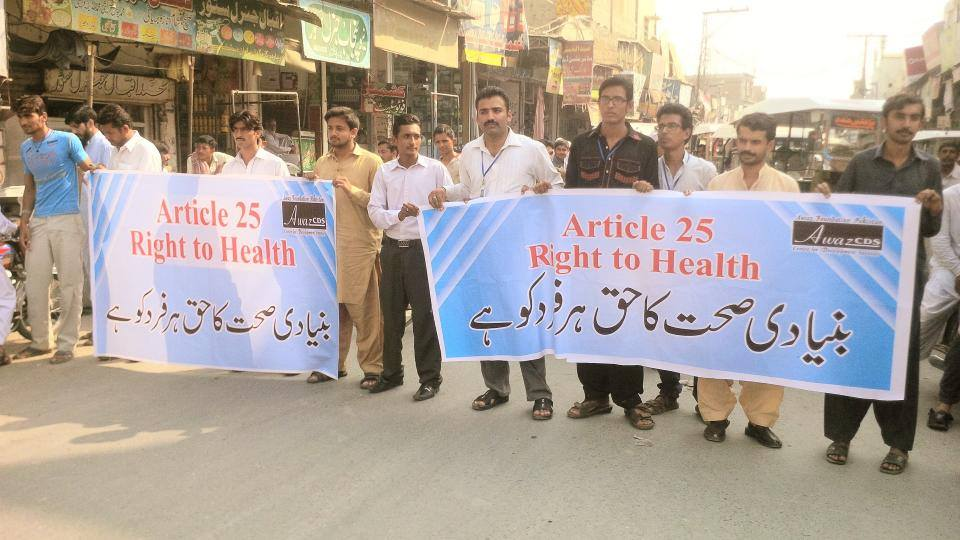
Protestors rally for the right to health in Pakistan

The right to health is the economic, social, and cultural right to a universal minimum standard of health to which all individuals are entitled. The concept of a right to health has been enumerated in international agreements which include the Universal Declaration of Human Rights, International Covenant on Economic, Social and Cultural Rights, and the Convention on the Rights of Persons with Disabilities. There is debate on the interpretation, application, and existence of the right to health due to considerations such as how health is defined, what minimum entitlements are encompassed in a right to health, and which institutions are responsible for ensuring a right to health.

The Human Rights Measurement Initiative measures the right to health for countries around the world, based on their level of income.

== Definition ==
=== Constitution of the World Health Organization (1946) ===
The preamble of the 1946 World Health Organization (WHO) Constitution defines health broadly as "a state of complete physical, mental and social well-being and not merely the absence of disease or infirmity." The Constitution defines the right to health as "the enjoyment of the highest attainable standard of health," and enumerates some principles of this right as healthy child development; equitable dissemination of medical knowledge and its benefits; and government-provided social measures to ensure adequate health.

Frank P. Grad credits the WHO Constitution as "claiming ... the full area of contemporary international public health," establishing the right to health as a "fundamental, inalienable human right" that governments cannot abridge, and are rather obligated to protect and uphold. The WHO Constitution, notably, marks the first formal demarcation of a right to health in international law.

=== Universal Declaration of Human Rights (1948) ===
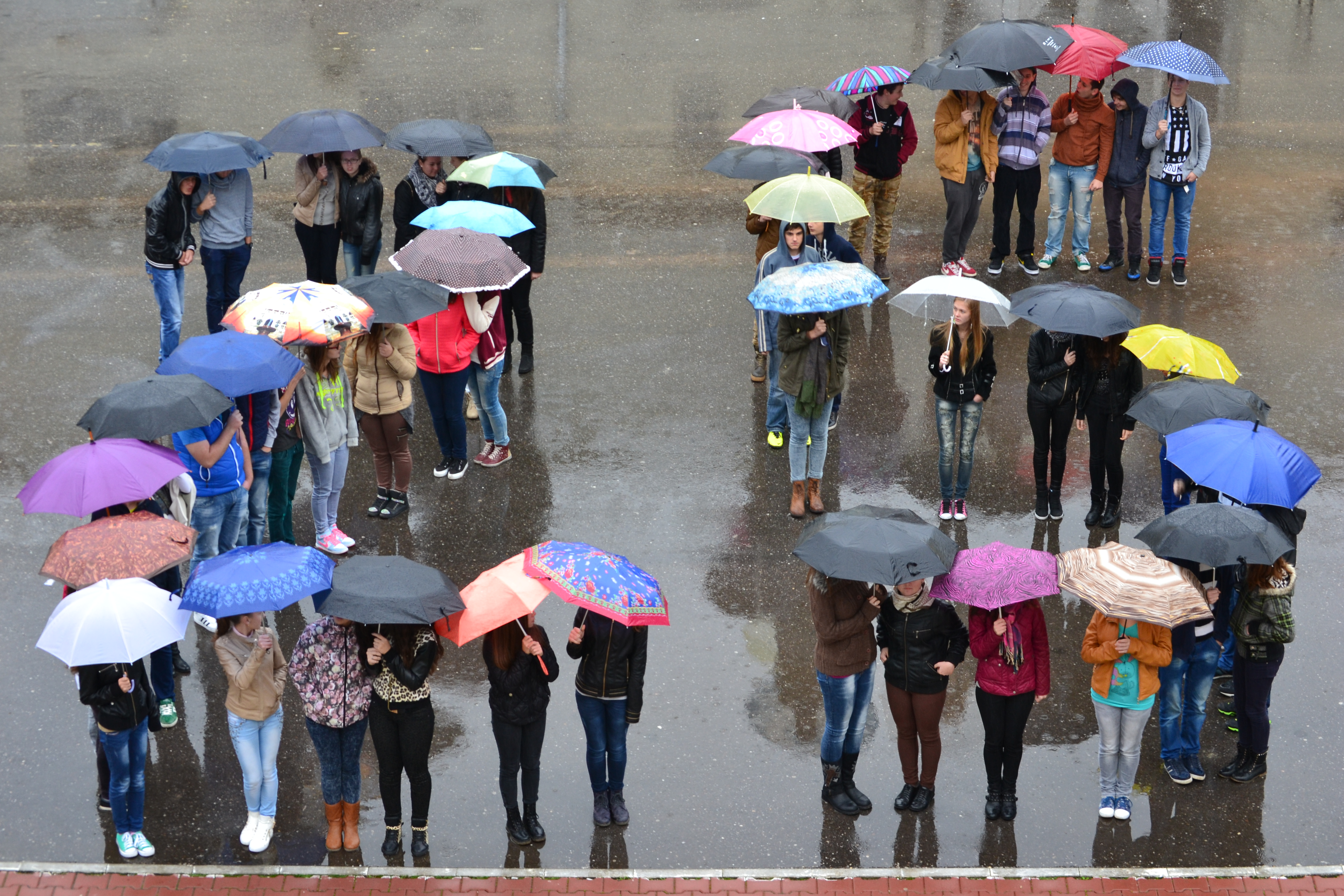
Romanian activists create a "25" using umbrellas, a reference to Article 25 of the United Nations' Universal Declaration of Human Rights.

Article 25 of the United Nations' 1948 Universal Declaration of Human Rights states that "Everyone has the right to a standard of living adequate for the health and well-being of himself and of his family, including food, clothing, housing and medical care and necessary social services." The Universal Declaration makes additional accommodations for security in case of physical debilitation or disability, and makes special mention of care given to those in motherhood or childhood.

The Universal Declaration of Human Rights is noted as the first international declaration of fundamental human rights, both freedoms and entitlements alike. United Nations High Commissioner for Human Rights Navanethem Pillay writes that the Universal Declaration of Human Rights "enshrines a vision that requires taking all human rights—civil, political, economic, social, or cultural—as an indivisible and organic whole, inseparable and interdependent." Likewise, Gruskin et al. contend that the interrelated nature of the rights expressed in the Universal Declaration establishes a "responsibility [that] extends beyond the provision of essential health services to tackling the determinants of health such as, provision of adequate education, housing, food, and favourable working conditions," further stating that these provisions "are human rights themselves and are necessary for health."

=== International Convention on the Elimination of All Forms of Racial Discrimination (1965) ===
Health is briefly addressed in the United Nations' International Convention on the Elimination of All Forms of Racial Discrimination, which was adopted in 1965 and entered into effect in 1969. The Convention calls upon States to "Prohibit and to eliminate racial discrimination in all its forms and to guarantee the right of everyone, without distinction as to race, color, or national or ethnic origin, to equality before the law," and references under this provision "The right to public health, medical care, social security and social services."

=== International Covenant on Economic, Social and Cultural Rights (1966) ===
States Parties and signatories of the International Covenant on Economic, Social and Cultural Rights. Parties and signatories to the ICESCR: Signed and ratified Signed but not ratified Neither signed nor ratified

The United Nations further defines the right to health in Article 12 of the 1966 International Covenant on Economic, Social and Cultural Rights, which states:

The States Parties to the present Covenant recognize the right of everyone to the enjoyment of the highest attainable standard of physical and mental health. The steps to be taken by the States Parties to the present Covenant to achieve the full realization of this right shall include those necessary for:

The reduction of the stillbirth-rate and of infant mortality and for the healthy development of the child;
The improvement of all aspects of environmental and industrial hygiene;
The prevention, treatment and control of epidemic, endemic, occupational and other diseases;
The creation of conditions which would assure to all medical service and medical attention in the event of sickness.

==== General Comment No. 14 (2000) ====
In 2000, the United Nations' Committee on Economic, Social and Cultural Rights issued General Comment No. 14, which addresses "substantive issues arising in the implementation of the International Covenant on Economic, Social and Cultural Rights" with respect to Article 12 and "the right to the highest attainable standard of health." The General Comment provides more explicit, operational language on the freedoms and entitlements included under a right to health,

The General Comment makes the direct clarification that "the right to health is not to be understood as a right to be healthy." Instead, the right to health is articulated as a set of both freedoms and entitlements which accommodate the individual's biological and social conditions as well as the State's available resources, both of which may preclude a right to be healthy for reasons beyond the influence or control of the State. Article 12 tasks the State with recognizing that each individual holds an inherent right to the best feasible standard of health, and itemizes (at least in part) the 'freedoms from' and 'entitlements to' that accompany such a right; however, it does not charge the State with ensuring that all individuals, in fact, are fully healthy, nor that all individuals have made full recognition of the rights and opportunities enumerated in the right to health.

===== Relation to other rights =====
Like the Universal Declaration of Human Rights, the General Comment clarifies the interrelated nature of human rights, stating that, "the right to health is closely related to and dependent upon the realization of other human rights," and thereby underscoring the importance of advancements in other entitlements such as the rights to food, work, housing, life, non-discrimination, human dignity, and access to importance, among others, towards the recognition of the right to health. Similarly, the General Comment acknowledges that "the right to health embraces a wide range of socio-economic factors that promote conditions in which people can lead a healthy life, and extends to the underlying determinants of health." In this respect, the General Comment holds that the specific steps towards realizing the right to health enumerated in Article 12 are non-exhaustive and strictly illustrative in nature.

The inextricable link between Health and Human Rights

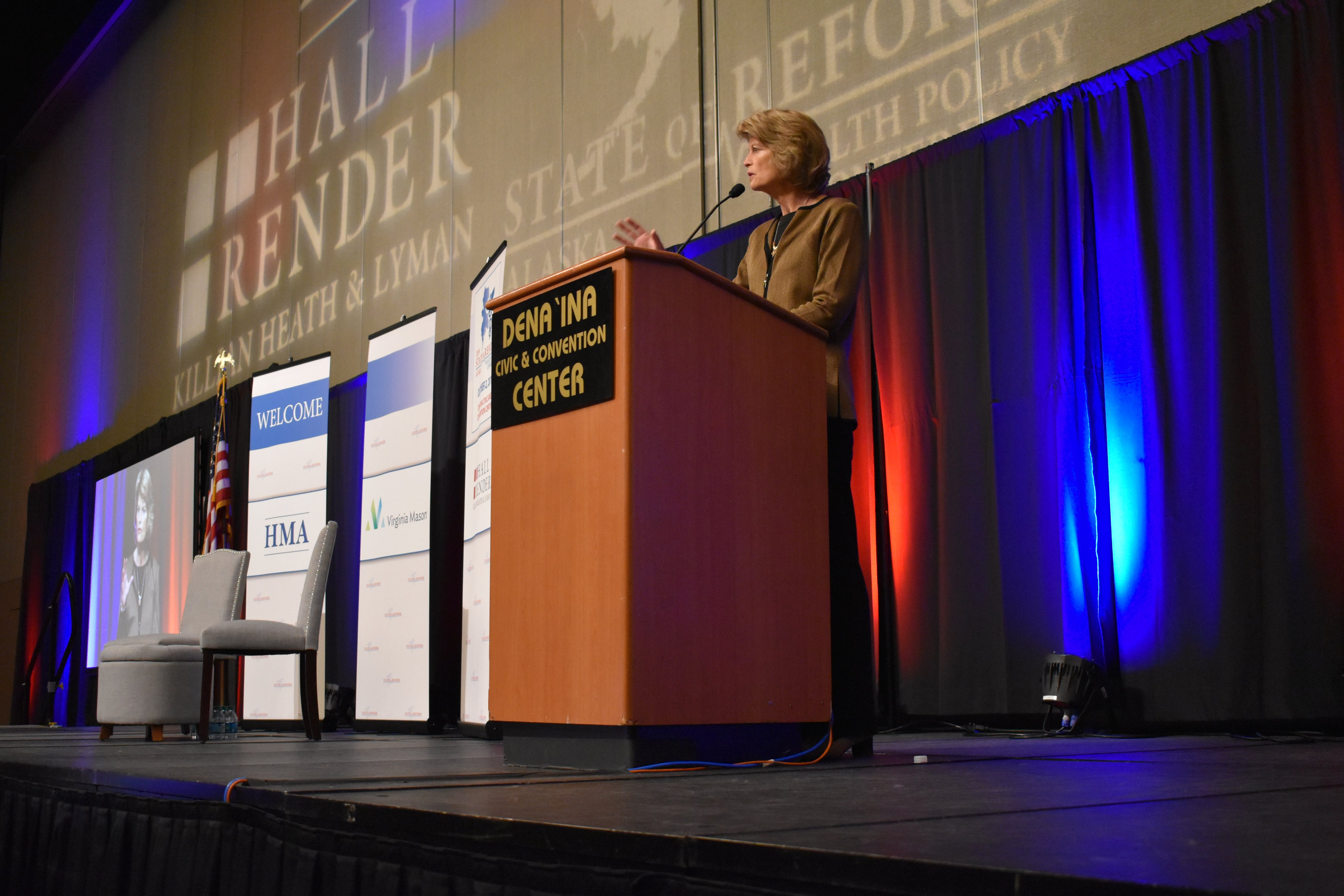
Lisa Murkowski at 2019 Alaska State of Reform Health Policy Conference

Jonathan Mann was a Francois-Xavier Bagnoud Professor of Health and Human Rights and Professor of Epidemiology and International Health at the Harvard T. H. Chan School of Public Health. He was known for being a powerful pioneer and advocate for the promotion of health, ethics, and human rights, championing the theory that Health and Human Rights were inextricably interlinked in a dynamic relationship.

According to Mann, Health and Human Rights are complementary approaches for defining and advancing human well-being. In 1994, Jonathan Mann and his colleagues started the "Health and Human Rights" to underline the importance of this inextricable link between Health and Human Rights.

In the first volume of the "Health and Human Rights", Jonathan Mann and his colleagues published a transformative article to explore the potential collaboration in Health and Human Rights. In this article, Mann et al. describe a framework for connecting the two domains that are interlinked. This framework is broken into three broad relationships.

The first relationship between Health and Human Rights is a political one. Mann and colleagues state that health policies, programs, and practices have an impact on human rights, especially when state power is considered in the realm of public health.

Next, the article posits a reverse relationship: that human rights violations have health impacts. It also calls for health expertise to help understand how health and well-being can be impacted by human rights violations through measurement and assessment.

The third segment of the framework linking Health and Human Rights introduces the concept that the protection and promotion of human rights and health are linked fundamentally in a dynamic relationship. While literature has largely supported the first two relationships, this third hypothesis has not been explored as substantially.

The article supports this concept by stating that this link suggests there are dramatic practical consequences in the independent operations of, but also in the interaction in activities of, the practice of public health and the practice of human rights. There is what is deemed an interdependence that cannot be negated. Mann and his colleagues further posit that research, education, experience, and advocacy are all required to understand this intersection, in order to understand and advance human well-being globally.

Ultimately, Mann and his colleague's mission is to convey that, while individual health has been much of the focus for medical and other health provision services, especially concerning physical illness and disability, public health's focus has more so evolved around how people can be healthy. According to this surprisingly simple definition, public health's mission is to promote positive health and prevention of health problems – disease, disability, premature death. That is, the traditional sense of individual health as understood and processed by health care services is "one essential condition for health", but does is not the sole qualifier or an exchangeable term with "health". In other words, health care services are not sufficient for health, as public health practitioners understand it – there are external factors that have both nuanced as well as pronounced positive and negative impact on health and well-being of the global human population.

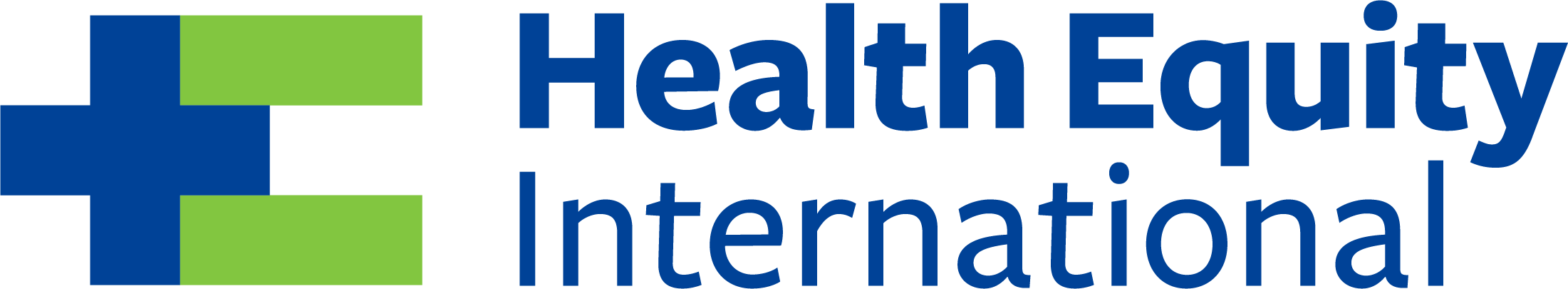
Health Equity logo

===== Health equity =====
The General Comment also makes additional reference to the question of health equity, a concept not addressed in the initial International Covenant. The document notes, "The Covenant proscribes any discrimination in access to health care and underlying determinants of health, as well as to means and entitlements for their procurement." Moreover, responsibility for ameliorating discrimination and its effects with regards to health is delegated to the State: "States have a special obligation to provide those who do not have sufficient means with the necessary health insurance and health-care facilities, and to prevent any discrimination on internationally prohibited grounds in the provision of health care and health services." Additional emphasis is placed upon non-discrimination on the basis of gender, age, disability, or membership in indigenous communities.

===== Responsibilities of states and international organizations =====
Subsequent sections of the General Comment detail the obligations of nations and international organizations towards a right to health. The obligations of nations are placed into three categories: obligations to respect, obligations to protect, and obligations to fulfill the right to health. Examples of these (in non-exhaustive fashion) include preventing discrimination in access or delivery of care; refraining from limitations to contraceptive access or family planning; restricting denial of access to health information; reducing environmental pollution; restricting coercive and/or harmful culturally-based medical practices; ensuring equitable access to social determinants of health; and providing proper guidelines for the accreditation of medical facilities, personnel, and equipment. International obligations include allowing for the enjoyment of health in other countries; preventing violations of health in other countries; cooperating in the provision of humanitarian aid for disasters and emergencies; and refraining from use of embargoes on medical goods or personnel as an act of political or economic influence.

=== Convention on the Elimination of All Forms of Discrimination Against Women ===
Participation in the Convention on the Elimination of All Forms of Discrimination Against Women (CEDAW): Party through signature and ratification Party through accession or succession Unrecognized state, abiding by treaty Only signed Non-signatory

Article 12 of the 1979 United Nations Convention on the Elimination of All Forms of Discrimination against Women outlines women's protection from gender discrimination when receiving health services and women's entitlement to specific gender-related healthcare provisions. The full text of Article 12 states:

Article 12:

1. States Parties shall take all appropriate measures to eliminate discrimination against women in the field of health care in order to ensure, on a basis of equality of men and women, access to health care services, including those related to family planning.
2. Notwithstanding the provisions of paragraph I of this article, States Parties shall ensure to women appropriate services in connection with pregnancy, confinement and the post-natal period, granting free services where necessary, as well as adequate nutrition during pregnancy and lactation.

=== Convention on the Rights of the Child ===
States parties to the Convention on the Rights of the Child: Parties Only signed, but not ratified Non-signatory

Health is mentioned on several instances in the Convention on the Rights of the Child (1989). Article 3 calls upon parties to ensure that institutions and facilities for the care of children adhere to health standards. Article 17 recognizes the child's right to access information that is pertinent to his/her physical and mental health and well-being. Article 23 makes specific reference to the rights of disabled children, in which it includes health services, rehabilitation, preventive care. Article 24 outlines child health in detail, and states, "Parties recognize the right of the child to the enjoyment of the highest attainable standard of health and to facilities for the treatment of illness and rehabilitation of health. States shall strive to ensure that no child is deprived of his or her right of access to such health care services." Towards implementation of this provision, the Convention enumerates the following measures:

- To diminish infant and child mortality;
- To ensure the provision of necessary medical assistance and health care to all children with an emphasis on the development of primary health care;
- To combat disease and malnutrition, including within the framework of primary health care, through, inter alia, the application of readily available technology and through the provision of adequate nutritious foods and clean drinking-water, taking into consideration the dangers and risks of environmental pollution;
- To ensure appropriate pre-natal and post-natal health care for mothers;
- To ensure that all segments of society, in particular parents and children, are informed, have access to education and are supported in the use of basic knowledge of child health and nutrition, the advantages of breastfeeding, hygiene and environmental sanitation and the prevention of accidents;
- To develop preventive health care, guidance for parents and family planning education and services.

The World Health Organization website comments, "The CRC is the normative and legal framework for WHO's work across the broad spectrum of child and adolescent health." Goldhagen presents the CRC as a "template for child advocacy" and proposes its use as a framework for reducing disparities and improving outcomes in child health.

=== Convention on the Rights of Persons with Disabilities ===
Article 25 of the Convention on the Rights of Persons with Disabilities (2006) specifies that "persons with disabilities have the right to the enjoyment of the highest attainable standard of health without discrimination on the basis of disability." The sub-clauses of Article 25 state that States shall give disabled people the same "range, quality, and standard" of health care as it provides to other persons, as well as those services specifically required for prevention, identification, and management of disability. Further provisions specify that health care for disabled people should be made available in local communities and that care should be geographically equitable, with additional statements against the denial or unequal provision of health services (including "food and fluids" and "life insurance") on the basis of disability.

Hendriks criticizes the failure of the convention to define specifically the term "disability"; he contends further that "the absence of a clear description [...] may prejudice the uniform interpretation, or at least place in jeopardy the consistent protection the Convention seeks to guarantee." He does, however, acknowledge that the lack of a clear definition for "disability" may benefit disabled people by limiting the State's ability to limit extension of the convention's provisions to specific populations or those with certain conditions.

=== Definitions in academic literature ===
While most human rights are theoretically framed as negative rights, meaning that they are areas upon which society cannot interfere or restrict by political action, Mervyn Susser contends that the right to health is a particularly unique and challenging right because it is often expressed as a positive right, where society bears an obligation to provide certain resources and opportunities to the general population.

Susser further sets out four provisions that he sees as covered under a right to health: equitable access to health and medical services; a "good-faith" social effort to promote equal health among different social groups; means to measure and assess health equity; and equal sociopolitical systems to give all parties a unique voice in health advocacy and promotion. He is careful to note here that, while this likely entails some minimum standard of access to health resources, it does not guarantee or necessitate an equitable state of health for each person due to inherent biological differences in health status. This distinction is an important one, as some common critiques of a "right to health" are that it establishes a right to an unreachable standard and that it aspires to a state of health that is too subjectively variable from person to person or from one society to the next.

While Susser's discussion centers on healthcare as a positive right, Paul Hunt refutes this view and makes the argument that the right to health also encompasses certain negative rights such as a protection from discrimination and the right to not receive medical treatment without the recipient's voluntary consent. However, Hunt does concede that some positive rights, such as the responsibility of society to pay special attention to the health needs of the underserved and vulnerable, are included in the right to health.

Paul Farmer addresses the issue of unequal access to health care in his article, "The Major Infectious Diseases in the World - To Treat or Not to Treat." He discusses the growing "outcome gap" between the populations receiving health interventions and the ones that are not. Poor people are not receiving the same treatment, if any at all, as the more financially fortunate. The high costs of medicine and treatment make it problematic for poor countries to receive equal care. He states, "Excellence without equity looms as the chief human-rights dilemma of health care in the 21st century."

== Human right to health care ==
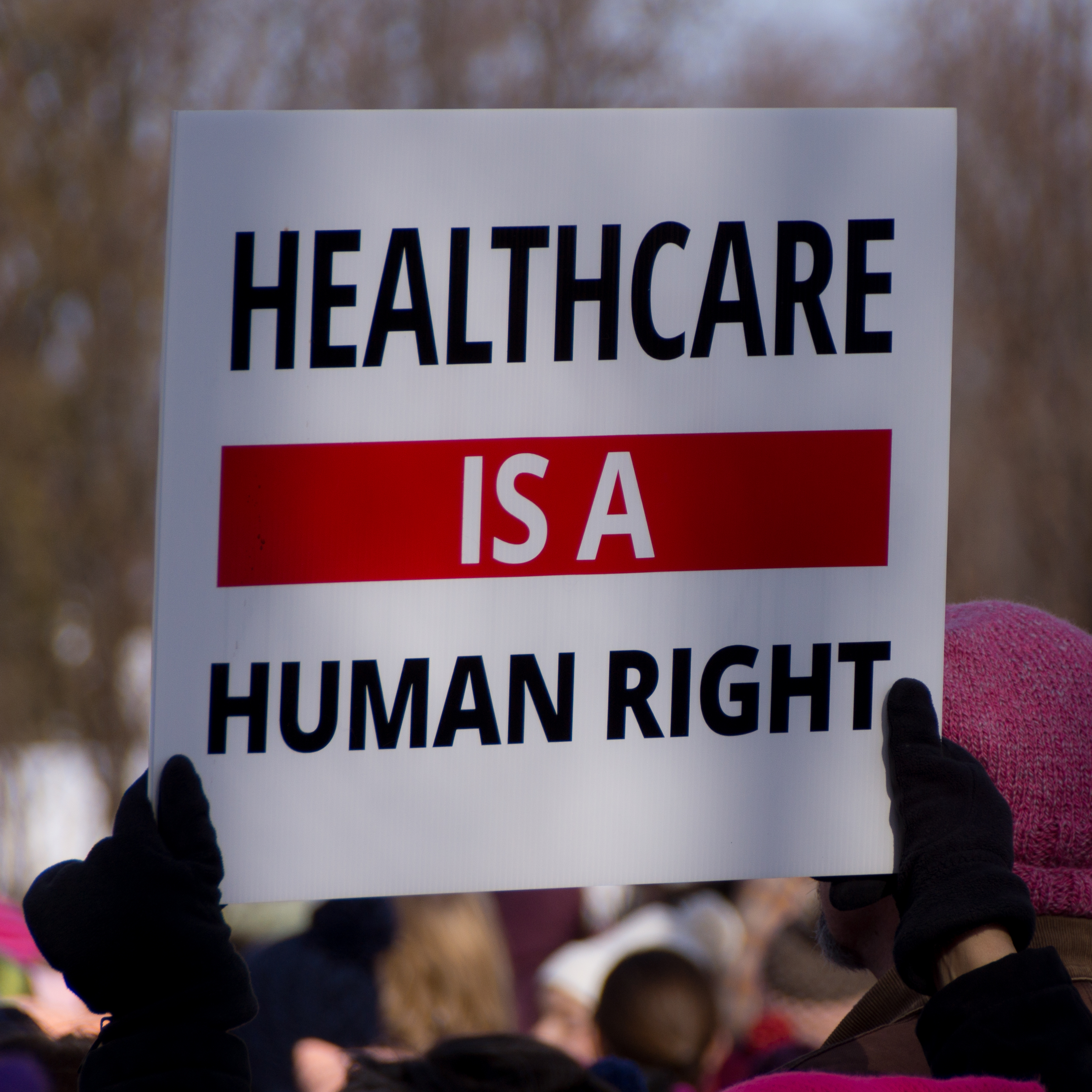
"Healthcare is a human right" sign

An alternative way to conceptualize one facet of the right to health is a "human right to health care." Notably, this encompasses both patient and provider rights in the delivery of healthcare services, the latter being similarly open to frequent abuse by the states. Patient rights in health care delivery include: the right to privacy, information, life, and quality care, as well as freedom from discrimination, torture, and cruel, inhumane, or degrading treatment. Marginalized groups, such as migrants and persons who have been displaced, racial and ethnic minorities, women, sexual minorities, and those living with HIV, are particularly vulnerable to violations of human rights in healthcare settings. For instance, racial and ethnic minorities may be segregated into poorer quality wards, disabled persons may be contained and forcibly medicated, drug users may be denied addiction treatment, women may be forced into vaginal examinations and may be denied life-saving abortions, suspected homosexual men may be forced into anal examinations, and women of marginalized groups and transgender persons may be forcibly sterilized.

Provider rights include: the right to quality standards of working conditions, the right to associate freely, and the right to refuse to perform a procedure based on their morals. Healthcare providers often experience violations of their rights. For instance, particularly in countries with weak rule of law, healthcare providers are often forced to perform procedures which negate their morals, deny marginalized groups the best possible standards of care, breach patient confidentiality, and conceal crimes against humanity and torture. Furthermore, providers who do not oblige these pressures are often persecuted. Currently, especially in the United States, much debate surrounds the issue of "provider consciousness", which retains the right of providers to abstain from performing procedures that do not align with their moral code, such as abortions.

Legal reform as a mechanism to combat and prevent violations of patient and provider rights presents a promising approach. However, in transitional countries (newly formed countries undergoing reform), and other settings with weak rule of law, this may be limited. Resources and tools for lawyers, providers, and patients interested in improving human rights in patient care have been formulated.

== Constitutional right to health care ==
As of 2008, at least 115 national constitutions now recognize the right to health. Sometimes, these rights are justiciable, meaning that they can be pursued by action in court. Indeed, a trend in constitutional reform around the world has been both to entrench the right to health and make it justiciable. The US is an outlier to these trends, at least at the federal level. Nonetheless, there have been campaigns in the US seeking to support a constitutional recognition of the right to health. Where constitutions do recognize a justiciable right to health, the responses by courts has been mixed.

In 2022, Oregon became the first US state to enact a constitutional right to health care through Oregon Ballot Measure 111.

== Criticism ==
Harvard-trained scholar Philip Barlow writes that healthcare should not be considered a human right because of the difficulty of defining what it entails and where the 'minimum standard' of entitlements under the right ought to be established. Additionally, Barlow contends that rights establish duties upon others to protect or guarantee them, and that it is unclear who holds the social responsibility for the right to health. John Berkeley, in agreement with Barlow, critiques further that the right to health does not consider adequately the responsibility that an individual has to uphold his or her own health.

American writer and politician Richard Lamm has argued against making healthcare a right. He defines a right as one that is to be defended at all costs, and a concept that is defined and interpreted by the judicial system. Making healthcare a right would require governments to spend a large portion of their resources to ensure said right. Lamm asserts that such systems rest on the erroneous assumption of unlimited resources; limited resources inhibit governments from providing everyone with adequate healthcare, especially long-term, and attempting to do so could lead to economic collapse. He maintains that access to healthcare is but one factor in producing a healthy society and that resources should also support broader social determinants of health.

Another line of criticism holds that a formal right to health is not feasible. Imre J.P. Loefler, a surgeon and former editor of Nairobi Hospital Proceedings and frequent contributor to the British Medical Journal, has described assertions of a human right to healthcare as a "meaningless and devastating manifesto." He argues that the financial and logistical burdens of ensuring healthcare for all are unattainable, and that resource constraints make it unrealistic to treat indefinite prolongation of life as a right. Loefler suggests that improving population health is better served through socioeconomic policy than through formal rights claims.

=== Distinction between rights and entitlements ===
Many critiques argue that the so-called "right to health" is not a right in the classical sense of a negative liberty (requiring only non-interference by others), but a positive entitlement or claim-right to goods and services that imposes affirmative duties on the state or third parties, typically though taxation, regulation or mandates. Philosopher Robert Nozick argued in Anarchy, State, and Utopia (1974) that enforcing such positive claims requires coercive redistribution that violates individuals' negative rights and historical entitlements to property. Because the content of any "minimum standard" of health is inherently indeterminate and subject to political and bureaucratic decisions over scarce resources, these critics maintain that the concept operates more as an aspirational welfare entitlement or policy goal than as a fundamental, justiciable human right.

== See also ==
- Global health
- Health and Human Rights (journal)
- Health care rationing
- Health economics
- Health promotion
- Health policy
- Health system
- Health law
- My body, my choice
- Patients' rights
- Primary health care
- Universal health care

== Bibliography ==
- Andrew Clapham, Mary Robinson (eds), Realizing the Right to Health, Zurich: rüffer & rub, 2009.
- Bogumil Terminski, Selected Bibliography on Human Right to Health, Geneva: University of Geneva, 2013.
- Judith Paula Asher, The Right to Health: A Resource Manual for Ngos, Dordrecht: Martinus Nijhoff Publishers, 2010. I
