= Committee on Economic, Social and Cultural Rights =

United Nations treaty body

The Committee on Economic, Social and Cultural Rights (CESCR) is a United Nations treaty body entrusted with overseeing the implementation of the International Covenant on Economic, Social and Cultural Rights (ICESCR). It is composed of 18 experts.

It meets (usually twice per year) to consider measures which States parties to the ICESCR have taken, progress they made and obstacles they have encountered in achieving the observance of the rights recognized in the ICESCR.

The Committee's 18 members come from different countries. They serve in their personal capacity, meaning they are not UN staff, are not paid a salary to sit on the Committee, and do not represent their country of citizenship. Like the other human rights treaty monitoring bodies, the CESCR is tasked with the interpretation and monitoring of a specific treaty (the ICESCR in this case). The CESCR carries out its mandate by reviewing periodically the implementation of the treaty in each country that has ratified it, developing ‘general comments’ that interpret specific provisions of the treaty, and adjudicating individual complaints.

CESCR Members are elected for a term of four years by the ECOSOC, in accordance with ECOSOC Resolution 1985/17 of 28 May 1985.

Members serve in their personal capacity and may be re-elected if nominated.

== Members ==
Name	State	Term Expires
Aslan Abashidze	Russian Federation	31.12.2026
Nadir Adilov	Azerbaijan	31.12.2028
Lazhari Bouzid	Algeria	31.12.2028
Asraf Ally Caunhye	Mauritius	31.12.2026
Peijie Chen	China	31.12.2028
Laura-Maria Crăciunean-Tatu (Chair)	Romania	31.12.2028
Charafat El YEedri Afailal	Morocco	31.12.2028
Peters Sunday Omologbe Emuze (Vice-Chair And Rapporteur)	Nigeria	31.12.2026
Santiago Manuel Fiorio Vaesken	Paraguay	31.12.2026
Ludovic Hennebel (Vice-Chair)	Belgium	31.12.2026
Joo-Young Lee	South Korea	31.12.2026
Karla Vanessa Lemus De Vásquez (Vice-Chair)	El Salvador	31.12.2026
Seree Nonthasoot	Thailand	31.12.2028
Giuseppe Palmisano	Italy	31.12.2028
Laura Elisa Pérez	Mexico	31.12.2028
Julieta Rossi	Argentina	31.12.2026
Preeti Saran (Vice-Chair)	India	31.12.2026
Michael Windfuhr	Germany	31.12.2028
