= Index of international public law articles =

List of international public law topics:

This is a comprehensive list of pages dealing with public international law, i.e. those areas of law dealing with the United Nations System and the Law of Nations. It is being started as a sublist as it is a specialized area of law that often does not interact with general legal topics. There is also a separate List of treaties.

- Berne Convention for the Protection of Literary and Artistic Works
- Convention on Biological Diversity
- Convention on the Rights of the Child
- Crime against international law
- Declaration of war
- Directive on harmonising the term of copyright protection
- EU Copyright Directive
- European Union law
- European Company Statute
- General Agreement on Tariffs and Trade
- Geneva Conventions
- History of public international law
- Human Rights Committee
- International copyright
- International Court of Justice
- International Criminal Tribunal for the Former Yugoslavia
- International Criminal Tribunal for Rwanda
- International Criminal Court
- International Covenant on Civil and Political Rights
- International Covenant on Economic, Social, and Cultural Rights
- International human rights law
- International humanitarian law
- International judicial institutions
- International Prize Court
- International trade law
- Laws of war
- List of treaties
- Madrid Agreement
- Notable UN General Assembly Resolutions
- Permanent Court of Arbitration
- Refugees
- Treaty of Maastricht
- UN Economic and Social Council
- United Nations High Commissioner for Refugees
- United Nations Relief and Works Agency for Palestine Refugees in the Near East
- United Nations System
- Universal Copyright Convention
- WIPO Copyright Treaty
- WIPO Performances and Phonograms Treaty
- World Health Organization
- World Intellectual Property Organization
- World Trade Organization
