= Outline of law =

Overview of and topical guide to law

The following outline is provided as an overview of and introduction to law:

Law is the set of rules and principles (laws) by which a society is governed, through enforcement by governmental authorities. Law is also the field that concerns the creation and administration of laws, and includes any and all legal systems.

== Nature of law ==
Law can be described as all of the following:

- Academic discipline – the body of knowledge given to - or received by - a disciple (student); a branch or sphere of knowledge, or field of study, that an individual has chosen to specialise in.
  - one of the humanities – an academic discipline that studies the human condition, using methods that are primarily analytical, critical, or speculative, as distinguished from the mainly empirical approaches of the natural sciences.
- System – set of elements (often called 'components' instead) and relationships which are different from relationships of the set or its elements to other elements or sets.
  - part of the legal system – legal scholarship and practice shapes how the law is interpreted and applied in societies

== Legal systems ==
- Common law
- Civil law (legal system)
- Religious law
  - Bahá'í laws
  - Biblical law
  - Canon law
  - Halakha
  - Hindu law
  - Jain law
  - Pāṭimokkha
  - Sharia
- Traditional Chinese law

== Law by source ==
=== Municipal law ===
==== Primary authority ====
- Constitutions
- Basic laws
- Primary and secondary legislation
- Executive orders
- Precedent (Judicial decisions / stare decisis)

==== Secondary authority ====
- Legal treatise
- Restatements of the Law (United States)

=== International law ===
- Treaty
- Customary international law
- General principles of law
- Judicial decisions and juristic writings

== Branches of law ==
- Substantive law

=== International law ===
- Conflict of laws (Private international law)
- Public international law
- Law of the sea
- International trade law
- International commercial law
- International criminal law
- International labour law
- International environmental law
- International human rights law

=== Public law ===
- Constitutional law
- Administrative law
- Criminal law
- Tax law (revenue law)

=== Private law ===
- Contract law
- Tort law
- Property law
- Succession
- Equity
- Trusts
- Family law

=== Commercial law ===
- Corporate law
- Competition law
- Insurance law
- Insolvency law
- Intellectual property law

=== Procedural law ===
- Civil procedure
- Criminal procedure
- Law of evidence

== Laws by jurisdictional scope ==
- International law
- Supranational law
  - Law of the European Union
    - Treaties of the European Union
    - Regulation (European Union)
    - Directive (European Union)
    - European Union decision
    - European Union legislative procedure
- Municipal law
  - Federal law (National law)
  - State law
  - Local ordinance

== History ==
- Cuneiform law
- Babylonian law
- Ancient Greek law
- Roman law
  - Byzantine law
- Early Germanic law
- Legal history of the Catholic Church
  - Jus antiquum

== Basic legal concepts ==
- Ignorantia juris non excusat
- Presumption of innocence
  - Presumption (canon law)
- Treason
- Rights (Outline)
- Rule of law

== Lists ==
=== Sources of law ===
==== Municipal case law ====
- Lists of case law
- List of copyright case law
- List of Judicial Committee of the Privy Council cases
- List of United Kingdom House of Lords cases
  - List of notable United Kingdom House of Lords cases
- List of Supreme Court of Canada cases
- List of United States Supreme Court cases

==== Municipal legislative instruments ====
- List of civil codes
- List of criminal codes
- List of government gazettes
- List of Uniform Acts (United States)
- List of United States federal legislation

==== International and supranational law ====
- List of treaties
- List of international environmental agreements
- Lists of United Nations Security Council resolutions
- Select list of General Assembly resolutions
- List of European Union directives
- List of European Union regulations
- List of international declarations

==== International and supranational case law ====
- List of International Court of Justice cases
- International Tribunal for the Law of the Sea
- List of people indicted in the International Criminal Court
- Inter-American Court of Human Rights
- List of European Court of Human Rights judgments
- List of European Court of Justice rulings

==== Other ====
- List of codes of canon law
- List of edicts

=== Legal institutions and jurists ===
==== National legal systems ====
- List of national legal systems
- List of national constitutions
- List of ancient legal codes
- List of legislatures by country
- List of current heads of state and government

==== Courts ====
- List of supreme courts by country
- List of constitutional courts
- List of courts in England and Wales
- List of High Courts of India
- List of international courts
- List of ad hoc international criminal tribunals

==== Legal professionals and jurists ====
- Lists of supreme court justices
- List of jurists
- Lists of law schools
- List of largest law firms by revenue
- Historical lists of Privy Counsellors

=== Legal topics and reference ===
- List of law journals
- List of legal abbreviations
- List of Latin legal terms
- List of business law topics
- List of international public law topics
- List of international trade topics
