= Rights =

Legal, social, or ethical principles

Rights are legal, social, or ethical principles of freedom or entitlement; that is, rights are the fundamental normative rules about what is allowed of people or owed to people according to some legal system, social convention, or ethical theory. Rights are an important concept in law and ethics, especially theories of justice and deontology.

The history of social conflicts has often involved attempts to define and redefine rights. According to the Stanford Encyclopedia of Philosophy, "rights structure the form of governments, the content of laws, and the shape of morality as it is currently perceived".

== History ==
A prevailing view in historical scholarship was that there was no conception of "rights" in the ancient world. This view was captured by Alasdair MacIntyre, who wrote, "there is no expression in any ancient or medieval language correctly translated by our expression 'a right' until near the close of the Middle Ages: the concept lacks any means of expression in Hebrew, Greek, Latin or Arabic, classical or medieval, before about 1400," adding that if even such rights existed, "no one could have known that there were." Similarly, Benjamin Constant stated, "The ancients ... had no conception of individual rights."

However, more recent scholarship has challenged notions that rights did not exist in the ancient world.

== Types of rights ==
=== Natural versus legal ===
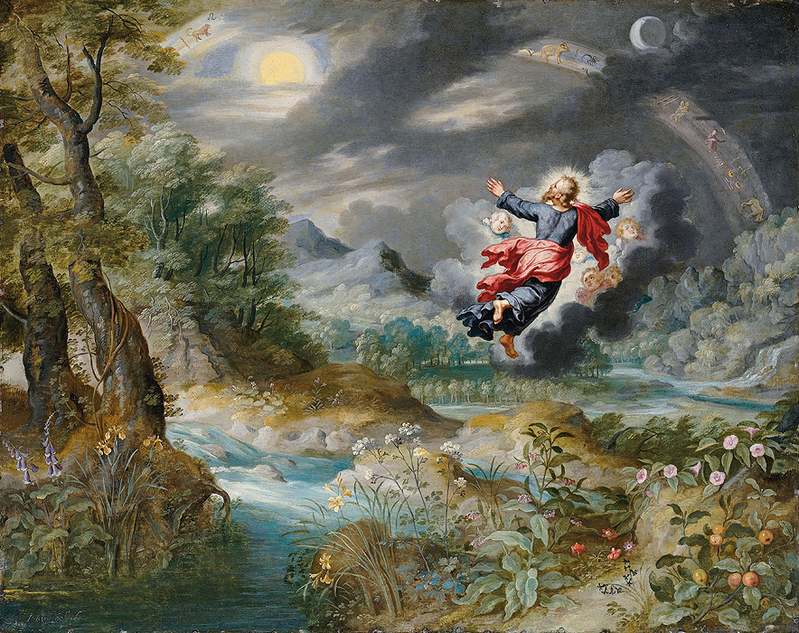
According to some views, certain rights derive from deities or nature.

- Natural rights are rights which are "natural" in the sense of "not artificial, not man-made", as in rights deriving from human nature or from the edicts of a god. They are universal; that is, they apply to all people, and do not derive from the laws of any specific society. They exist necessarily, inhere in every individual, and cannot be taken away. For example, it has been argued that humans have a natural right to life. These are sometimes called moral rights or inalienable rights.
- Legal rights, in contrast, are based on a society's customs, laws, statutes or actions by legislatures. An example of a legal right is the right to vote of citizens. Citizenship, itself, is often considered as the basis for having legal rights, and has been defined as the "right to have rights". Legal rights are sometimes called civil rights or statutory rights and are culturally and politically relative since they depend on a specific societal context to have meaning.

Some thinkers see rights in only one sense while others accept that both senses have a measure of validity. There has been considerable philosophical debate about these senses throughout history. For example, Jeremy Bentham believed that legal rights were the essence of rights, and he denied the existence of natural rights, whereas Thomas Aquinas held that rights purported by positive law but not grounded in natural law were not properly rights at all, but only a facade or pretense of rights.

=== Claim versus liberty ===
- A claim right is a right which entails that another person has a duty to the right-holder. Somebody else must do or refrain from doing something to or for the claim holder, such as perform a service or supply a product for him or her; that is, he or she has a claim to that service or product (another term is thing in action). In logic, this idea can be expressed as: "Person A has a claim that person B do something if and only if B has a duty to A to do that something." Every claim-right entails that some other duty-bearer must do some duty for the claim to be satisfied. This duty can be to act or to refrain from acting. For example, many jurisdictions recognize broad claim rights to things like "life, liberty, and property"; these rights impose an obligation upon others not to assault or restrain a person, or use their property, without the claim-holder's permission. Likewise, in jurisdictions where social welfare services are guaranteed, citizens have legal claim rights to be provided with those services.
- A liberty right or privilege, in contrast, is simply a freedom or permission for the right-holder to do something, and there are no obligations on other parties to do or not do anything. This can be expressed in logic as: "Person A has a privilege to do something if and only if A has no duty not to do that something." For example, if a person has a legal liberty right to free speech, that merely means that it is not legally forbidden for them to speak freely: it does not mean that anyone has to help enable their speech, or to listen to their speech; or even, per se, refrain from stopping them from speaking, though other rights, such as the claim right to be free from assault, may severely limit what others can do to stop them.

Liberty rights and claim rights are the inverse of one another: a person has a liberty right permitting him to do something only if there is no other person who has a claim right forbidding him from doing so. Likewise, if a person has a claim right against someone else, then that other person's liberty is limited. For example, a person has a liberty right to walk down a sidewalk and can decide freely whether or not to do so, since there is no obligation either to do so or to refrain from doing so. But pedestrians may have an obligation not to walk on certain lands, such as other people's private property, to which those other people have a claim right. So a person's liberty right of walking extends precisely to the point where another's claim right limits his or her freedom.

=== Positive versus negative ===
In one sense, a right is a permission to do something or an entitlement to a specific service or treatment from others, and these rights have been called positive rights. However, in another sense, rights may allow or require inaction, and these are called negative rights; they permit or require doing nothing. For example, in some countries, e.g. the United States, citizens have the positive right to vote and they have the negative right to not vote; people can choose not to vote in a given election without punishment. In other countries, e.g. Australia, however, citizens have a positive right to vote but they do not have a negative right to not vote, since voting is compulsory. Accordingly:

- Positive rights are permissions to do things, or entitlements to be done unto. One example of a positive right is the purported "right to welfare".
- Negative rights are permissions not to do things, or entitlements to be left alone. Often the distinction is invoked by libertarians who think of a negative right as an entitlement to non-interference such as a right against being assaulted.

Though similarly named, positive and negative rights should not be confused with active rights (which encompass "privileges" and "powers") and passive rights (which encompass "claims" and "immunities").

=== Individual versus group ===
- Individual rights are rights held by individual people regardless of their group membership or lack thereof.

Do groups have rights? Some argue that when soldiers bond in combat, the group becomes like an organism in itself and has rights which trump the rights of any individual soldier.

- Group rights, including the rights of nations, have been argued to exist when a group is seen as more than a mere composite or assembly of separate individuals but an entity in its own right. In other words, it is possible to see a group as a distinct being in and of itself; it is akin to an enlarged individual, a corporate body, which has a distinct will and power of action and can be thought of as having rights. Rights of nations, including a national right to self-determination have been argued for, and a platoon of soldiers in combat can be thought of as a distinct group, since individual members are willing to risk their lives for the survival of the group, and therefore the group can be conceived as having a "right" which is superior to that of any individual member; for example, a soldier who disobeys an officer can be punished, perhaps even killed, for a breach of obedience. But there is another sense of group rights in which people who are members of a group can be thought of as having specific individual rights because of their membership in a group. In this sense, the set of rights which individuals-as-group-members have is expanded because of their membership in a group. For example, workers who are members of a group such as a labor union can be thought of as having expanded individual rights because of their membership in the labor union, such as the rights to specific working conditions or wages.

There can be tension between individual and group rights. A classic instance in which group and individual rights clash is conflicts between unions and their members. For example, individual members of a union may wish a wage higher than the union-negotiated wage, but are prevented from making further requests; in a so-called closed shop which has a union security agreement, only the union has a right to decide matters for the individual union members such as wage rates. So, do the supposed "individual rights" of the workers prevail about the proper wage? Or do the "group rights" of the union regarding the proper wage prevail?

The Austrian School of Economics holds that only individuals think, feel, and act whether or not members of any abstract group. The society should thus according to economists of the school be analyzed starting from the individual. This methodology is called methodological individualism and is used by the economists to justify individual rights. Similarly, the author Ayn Rand argued that only individuals have rights, according to her philosophy known as Objectivism. However, others have argued that there are situations in which a group of persons is thought to have rights, or group rights.

=== Other senses ===
Other distinctions between rights draw more on historical association or family resemblance than on precise philosophical distinctions. These include the distinction between civil and political rights and economic, social and cultural rights, between which the articles of the Universal Declaration of Human Rights are often divided. Another conception of rights groups them into three generations. These distinctions have much overlap with that between negative and positive rights, as well as between individual rights and group rights, but these groupings are not entirely coextensive.

=== Politics ===
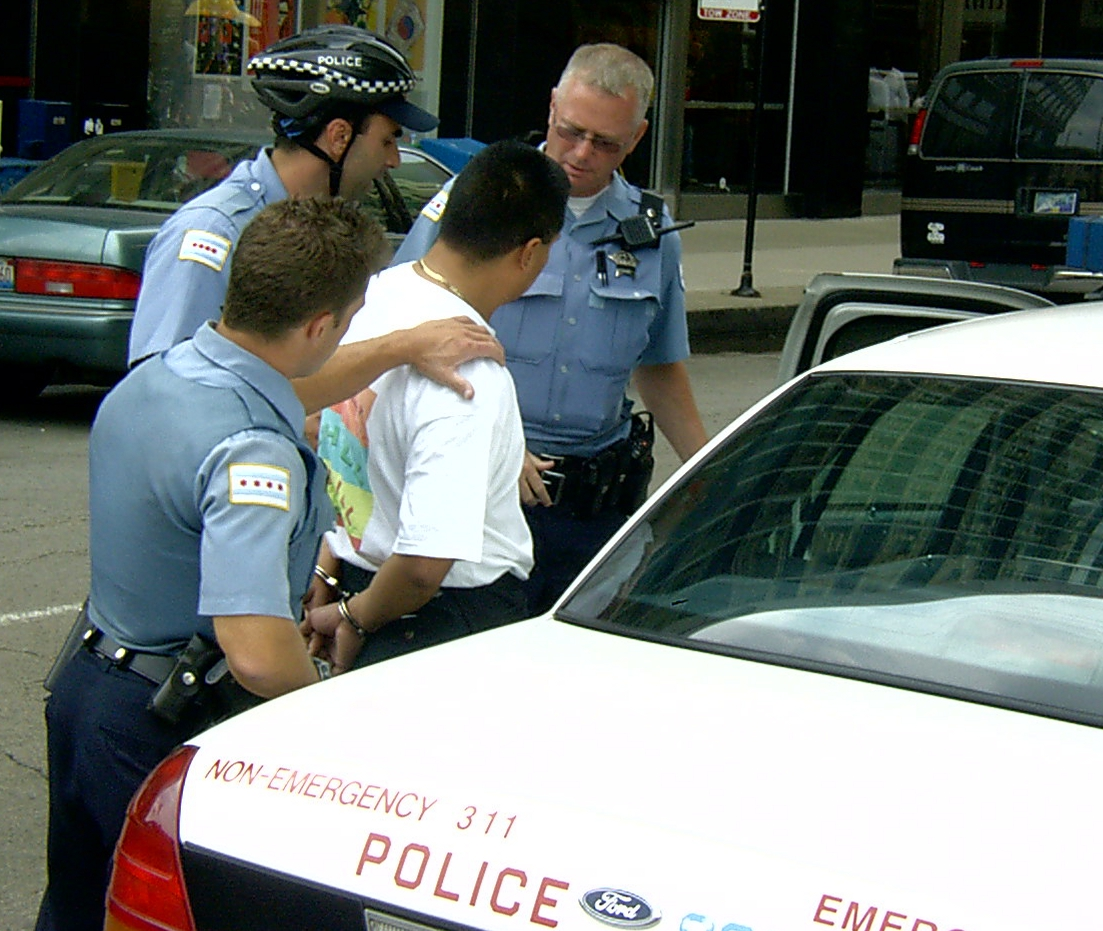
Police officers in the United States are required to read the Miranda warning between making an arrest and beginning an interrogation. The warning informs the person arrested that they have rights included in the Fifth Amendment. Failure to "read Miranda" disqualifies evidence obtained primarily in the questioning.

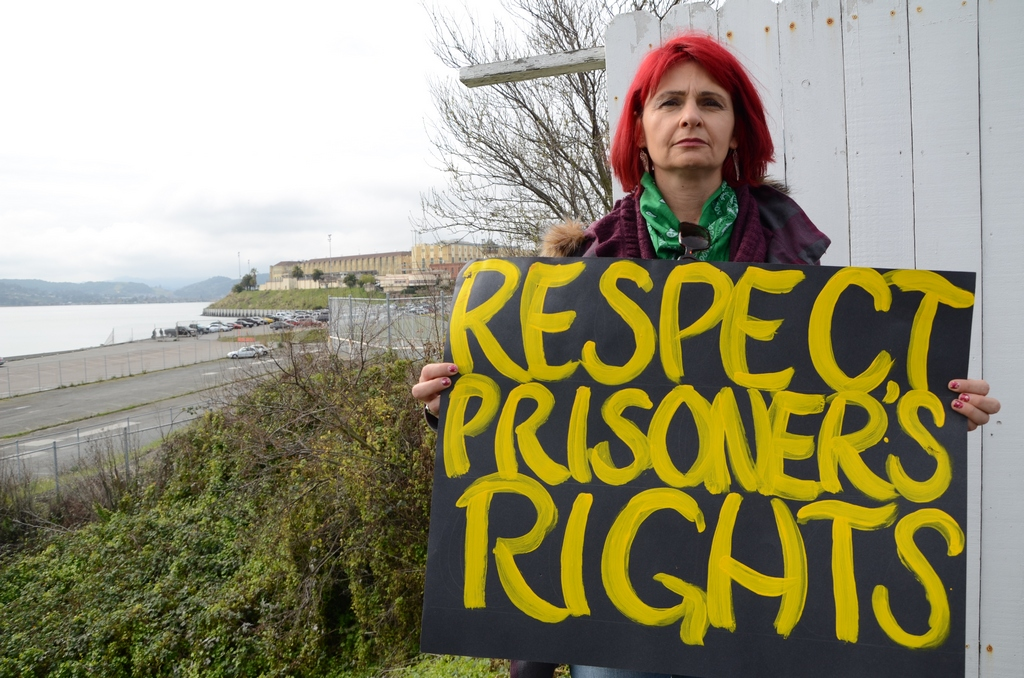
A campaigner for prisoners' rights

Rights are often included in the foundational questions that governments and politics have been designed to deal with. Often the development of these socio-political institutions have formed a dialectical relationship with rights.

Rights about particular issues, or the rights of particular groups, are often areas of special concern. Often these concerns arise when rights come into conflict with other legal or moral issues, sometimes even other rights. Issues of concern have historically included Indigenous rights, labor rights, LGBTQ rights, reproductive rights, disability rights, patient rights and prisoners' rights. With increasing monitoring and the information society, information rights, such as the right to privacy are becoming more important.

Some examples of groups whose rights are of particular concern include animals, and amongst humans, groups such as children and youth, parents (both mothers and fathers), and men and women.

Accordingly, politics plays an important role in developing or recognizing the above rights, and the discussion about which behaviors are included as "rights" is an ongoing political topic of importance. The concept of rights varies with political orientation. Positive rights such as a "right to medical care" are emphasized more often by left-leaning thinkers, while right-leaning thinkers place more emphasis on negative rights such as the "right to a fair trial".

Further, the term equality which is often bound up with the meaning of "rights" often depends on one's political orientation. Conservatives and right-wing libertarians and advocates of free markets often identify equality with equality of opportunity, and want what they perceive as equal and fair rules in the process of making things, while agreeing that sometimes these fair rules lead to unequal outcomes. In contrast, socialists see the power imbalance of employer-employee relationships in capitalism as a cause of inequality and often see unequal outcomes as a hindrance to equality of opportunity. They tend to identify equality of outcome as a sign of equality and therefore think that people have a right to portions of necessities such as health care or economic assistance or housing that align with their needs.

== Philosophy ==
In philosophy, meta-ethics is the branch of ethics that seeks to understand the nature of ethical properties, statements, attitudes, and judgments. Meta-ethics is one of the three branches of ethics generally recognized by philosophers, the others being normative ethics and applied ethics.

While normative ethics addresses such questions as "What should one do?", thus endorsing some ethical evaluations and rejecting others, meta-ethics addresses questions such as "What is goodness?" and "How can we tell what is good from what is bad?", seeking to understand the nature of ethical properties and evaluations.

Rights ethics is an answer to the meta-ethical question of what normative ethics is concerned with (meta-ethics also includes a group of questions about how ethics comes to be known, true, etc. which is not directly addressed by rights ethics). Rights ethics holds that normative ethics is concerned with rights. Alternative meta-ethical theories are that ethics is concerned with one of the following:

- Duties (deontology)
- Value (axiology)
- Virtue (virtue ethics)
- Consequences (consequentialism, e.g. utilitarianism)

Rights ethics has had considerable influence on political and social thinking. The Universal Declaration of Human Rights gives some concrete examples of widely accepted rights.

=== Criticism ===
Rights aren't rights if someone can take them away. They're privileges.

— George Carlin, It's Bad for Ya (2008)

Some philosophers have criticised some rights as ontologically dubious entities.

== History ==
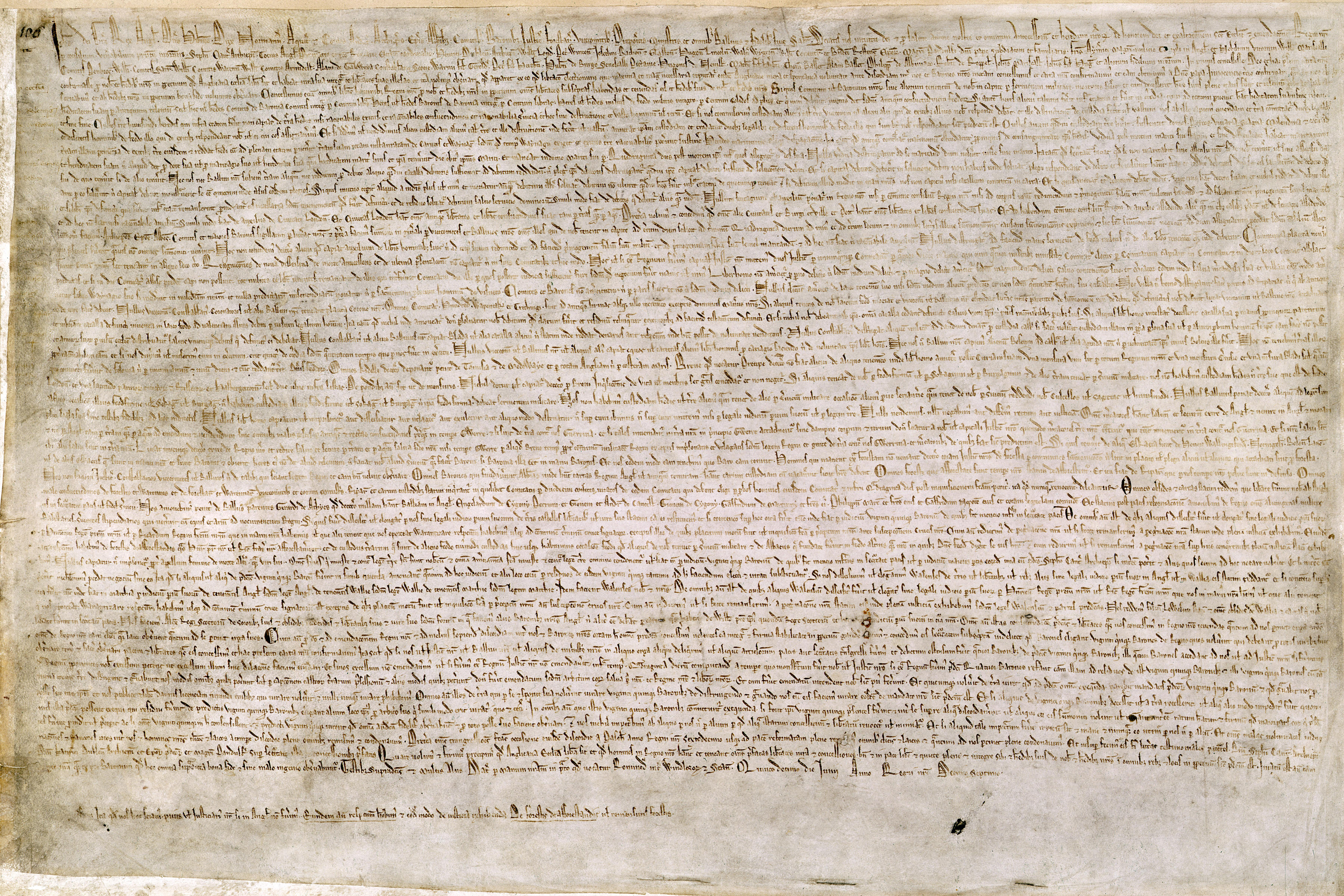
Magna Carta or "The Great Charter" was one of England's first documents containing commitments by a king to his people to respect certain legal rights. It reduced the power of the monarch.

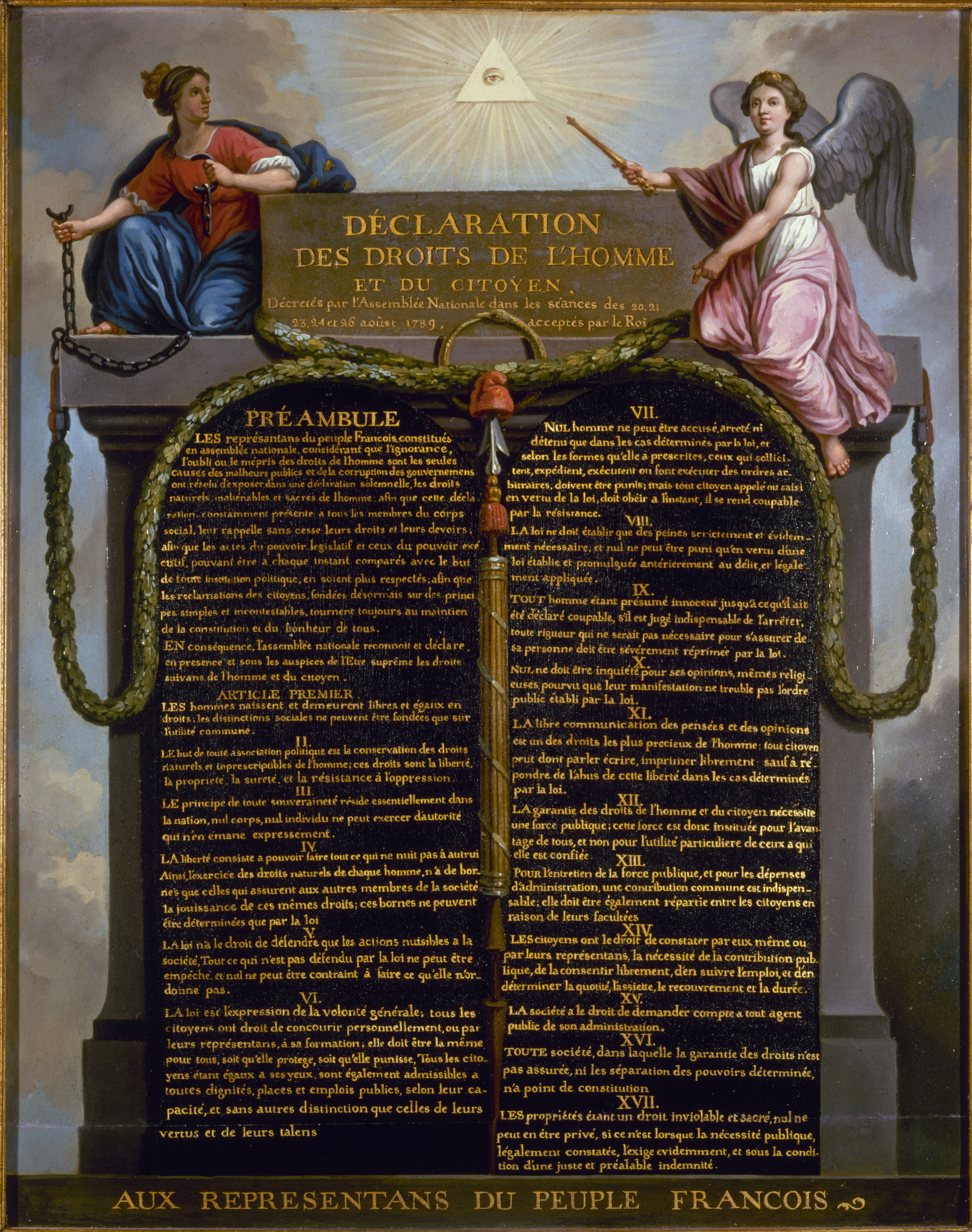
The Declaration of the Rights of Man and of the Citizen in 1789 in France

The specific enumeration of rights has differed greatly in different periods of history. In many cases, the system of rights promulgated by one group has come into sharp and bitter conflict with that of other groups. In the political sphere, a place in which rights have historically been an important issue, constitutional provisions of various states sometimes address the question of who has what legal rights.

Historically, many notions of rights were authoritarian and hierarchical, with different people granted different rights, and some having more rights than others. For instance, the right of a father to be respected by his son did not indicate a right of the son to receive something in return for that respect; and the divine right of kings, which permitted absolute power over subjects, did not leave much possibility for many rights for the subjects themselves.

In contrast, modern conceptions of rights have often emphasized liberty and equality as among the most important aspects of rights, as was evident in the American and French revolutions.

Important documents in the political history of rights include:

- The Persian Empire of ancient Iran established unprecedented principles of human rights in the 6th century BC under Cyrus the Great. After his conquest of Babylon in 539 BC, the king issued the Cyrus cylinder, discovered in 1879 and seen by some today as the first human rights document.
- The Constitution of Medina (622 AD; Arabia) instituted a number of rights for the Muslim, Jewish, camp followers and "believers" of Medina.
- Magna Carta (1215; England) required the King of England to renounce certain rights and respect certain legal procedures, and to accept that the will of the king could be bound by law, after King John promised his barons he would follow the "law of the land". While Magna Carta was originally a set of rules that the king had to follow, and mainly protected the property of aristocratic landowners, today it is seen as the basis of certain rights for ordinary people, such as the right of due process.
- The Declaration of Arbroath (1320; Scotland) established the right of the people to choose a head of state (see popular sovereignty).
- The Henrician Articles (1573; Poland-Lithuania) or King Henry's Articles were a permanent contract that stated the fundamental principles of governance and constitutional law in the Polish-Lithuanian Commonwealth, including the rights of the nobility to elect the king, to meet in parliament whose approval was required to levy taxes and declare war or peace, to religious liberty and the right to rebel in case the king transgressed against the laws of the republic or the rights of the nobility.
- The Bill of Rights (1689; England) declared that Englishmen, as embodied by Parliament, possess certain civil and political rights; the Claim of Right (1689; Scotland) was similar but distinct.
- The Virginia Declaration of Rights (1776) by George Mason declared the inherent natural rights and separation of powers.
- The United States Declaration of Independence (1776) succinctly defined the rights of man as including, but not limited to, "Life, liberty, and the pursuit of happiness" which later influenced "liberté, égalité, fraternité" (liberty, equality, fraternity) in France. The phrase can also be found in Chapter III, Article 13 of the 1947 Constitution of Japan, and in President Ho Chi Minh's 1945 declaration of independence of the Democratic Republic of Vietnam. An alternative phrase "life, liberty and property", is found in the Declaration of Colonial Rights, a resolution of the First Continental Congress. Also, Article 3 of the Universal Declaration of Human Rights reads, "Everyone has the right to life, liberty and security of person".
- The Declaration of the Rights of Man and of the Citizen (1789; France), one of the fundamental documents of the French Revolution, defined a set of individual rights and collective rights of the people.
- The Virginia Statute for Religious Freedom (1785; United States), written by Thomas Jefferson in 1779, was a document that asserted the right of man to form a personal relationship with God free from interference by the state.
- The United States Bill of Rights (1789–1791; United States), the first ten amendments of the United States Constitution specified rights of individuals in which government could not interfere, including the rights of free assembly, freedom of religion, trial by jury, and the right to keep and bear arms.
- The Constitution of Poland-Lithuania (1791; Poland-Lithuania) was the first constitution in Europe, and second in the world. It built upon previous Polish law documents such as the Henrician Articles, as well as the US constitution, and it too, specified many rights.
- The Universal Declaration of Human Rights (1948) is an overarching set of standards by which governments, organisations and individuals would measure their behaviour towards each other. The preamble declares that the "...recognition of the inherent dignity and of the equal and inalienable rights of all members of the human family is the foundation of freedom, justice and peace in the world..."
- The European Convention on Human Rights (1950; Europe) was adopted under the auspices of the Council of Europe to protect human rights and fundamental freedoms.
- The International Covenant on Civil and Political Rights (1966), a follow-up to the Universal Declaration of Human Rights, concerns civil and political rights.
- The International Covenant on Economic, Social and Cultural Rights (1966), another follow-up to the Universal Declaration of Human Rights, concerns economic, social and cultural rights.
- The Canadian Charter of Rights and Freedoms (1982; Canada) was created to protect the rights of Canadian citizens from actions and policies of all levels of government.
- The Charter of Fundamental Rights of the European Union (2000) is one of the most recent proposed legal instruments concerning human rights.

== See also ==
- Outline of rights
- Animal rights
- Contractual rights
- Constitutionalism
- Deed
- Droit
- Equal rights (disambiguation), various meanings
- Exclusive right
- Freedom of religion
- Freedom of speech
- Freedom of the press
- History of citizenship
- Jurisprudence
- Prerogative
- Right to food
- Right to housing
- Right to property
- Right to water
- Right to an adequate standard of living
- Right to health
- Right to social security
- Rule according to higher law
- Social contract

Organisations:

- Amnesty International
- Human Rights Watch
- United States Commission on Civil Rights
