= Other Mother =

Other Mother could refer to the following subjects:

- The Other Mother, a character from the 2002 novella Coraline
- Other Mommy, a 2026 horror film
- Othermother, a woman caring for children who are not biologically her own

== See also ==
- Stepmother
