= Outline of rights =

Overview of and topical guide to rights

The following outline is provided as an overview of and introduction to rights:

Rights – normative principles, variously construed as legal, social, or moral freedoms or entitlements.

== Theoretical distinctions ==
- Natural and legal rights
  - Natural law
  - Positive law
  - Social rights
    - Social contract
- Claim rights and liberty rights
  - Claim
  - Entitlement
  - Liberty
  - Freedom
- Negative and positive rights
- Individual rights
- Group rights

== Other divisions ==
- Three generations of human rights
- Civil and political rights and Economic, social and cultural rights

== By claimant ==
- Animal rights
- Human rights
  - Men's rights
    - Fathers' rights
  - Women's rights
    - Mothers' rights
  - Children's rights
    - List of children's rights topics
  - Youth rights
    - List of youth rights topics
  - Fetal rights
  - Student rights
  - Indigenous rights
  - Minority rights
  - LGBT rights

== Exclusive rights ==
- Intellectual property rights
  - Authors' rights
  - Copyright
  - Industrial design rights
  - Patent rights
  - Trademarks
- Property rights

== Other types ==
- Digital rights (rights to use digital resources)
- Labor rights
- Linguistic rights
- Reproductive rights
- Right to arms
- Disability rights
- Marital rights
- Prisoners' rights
  - Prisoner of war
- Right to life
- Right to die
- Divine Right of Kings
- Unenumerated rights
- Equal rights
- Fundamental rights
- Right to vote
  - Right of foreigners to vote
  - Right of expatriates to vote in their country of origin
- Political freedom
  - Freedom of assembly
  - Freedom of association
  - Freedom of movement
  - Freedom of religion
  - Freedom of speech
  - Freedom of the press
  - Freedom of thought
  - Freedom from unreasonable searches and seizures, which is related to freedom of privacy
  - Suffrage
  - Scientific freedom
  - Academic freedom
  - Habeas corpus
- International law
  - Universal Declaration of Human Rights
  - International Court of Justice
  - Laws of war
- By religion
  - Manusmṛti
  - Confucianism
  - Qur'an
  - Ten Commandments
  - Bushido
  - Juche

== History ==
History of human rights

- Age of Enlightenment
- Important bills of rights
  - Gender or Sex segregation
    - Women's suffrage
    - Sex segregation and Islam
  - Racial segregation
    - Racial segregation in the United States
      - Civil Rights Movement
      - American Indian Movement
  - Religious segregation
  - Residential segregation

== Related concepts ==
=== Movements ===
- Animal liberation movement
- Carers rights movement
- Children's rights movement
- Civil Rights Movement
- Disability rights movement
- LGBT social movements
- Fathers' rights movement
- Parents' rights movement
- Women's rights movement

=== Crimes against humanity ===
Crime against humanity

- Crime of apartheid
- Genocide
- Slavery
- Torture
- War crimes

== Notable people ==
=== Lists ===
- List of civil rights leaders
- List of disability rights activists
- List of LGBT rights activists
- List of opponents of slavery
- List of suffragists and suffragettes
- List of women's rights activists

=== Individuals ===
- Abraham Lincoln
- Andrei Sakharov
- Coretta Scott King
- Eleanor Roosevelt
- Elie Wiesel
- Jimmy Carter
- Margaret Sanger
- Martin Luther King Jr.
- Mohandas Gandhi
- Mikhail Gorbachev
- Nelson Mandela
- Raoul Wallenberg
- Stephen Biko
- John Locke
- Confucius
- Voltaire
- Montesquieu
- Jean-Jacques Rousseau
- Thomas Paine
- John Calvin
  - Calvinism
    - Five Points of Calvinism

== See also ==
- Ethics
  - Outline of ethics
- Government
- Law
  - Outline of law
- Political Science
- Rights of Man
