= USS Susan Ann Howard =

Tender of the United States Navy

History

United States
- Name: Susan Ann Howard
- Acquired: 19 May 1863
- In service: circa 5 June 1864
- Fate: Sold, 15 September 1864

General characteristics
- Length: 50 ft (15 m)
- Beam: 17 ft 4 in (5.28 m)
- Depth of hold: 5 ft 4 in (1.63 m)
- Propulsion: schooner sail

USS Susan Ann Howard was a schooner requisitioned from the prize court by the Union Navy during the Union blockade of the American Civil War.

Susan Ann Howard was used by the Union Navy for a number of minor roles: storeship, ammunition ship, and collier. She did not remain in service long.

== Service history ==
Few facts exist concerning Susan Ann Howard, a center-board schooner purchased by the Union Navy from the New York City Prize Court on 19 May 1863. Usually referred to as Susan A. Howard, the ship was listed on 5 June 1864 as one of a group of schooners serving on the sounds of North Carolina, presumably at New Bern, North Carolina, as ordnance and store vessels. On 7 July, she was at New Bern serving as an ordnance boat. On 7 September, she was listed as a hulk and serving as a coal schooner. On 30 August, the schooner was ordered to Washington, D.C.; and Susan Ann Howard was sold at the Washington Navy Yard on 15 September to H. F. Hammil.

== See also ==
- Blockade runners of the American Civil War
- Blockade mail of the Confederacy
