= Stanlie James =

American social scientist

Stanlie Myrise James is an American social scientist specializing in human rights, black feminism and black families. In 2016 she was appointed Vice Provost for Inclusion and Community Engagement at Arizona State University (ASU). She has been a Professor of African and African-American Studies at ASU since 2011. She is also a professor emerita in the Department of Afro-American Studies and the Women’s Studies Program at the University of Wisconsin–Madison.

James is co-editor of Theorizing Black Feminisms: The Visionary Pragmatism of Black Women (1993), Genital Cutting and Transnational Sisterhood: Disputing U.S. Polemics (2002), and Still Brave: The Evolution of Black Women's Studies (2009).

== Education ==
James obtained her BA in sociology and history in 1971 from Spelman College, Atlanta, and her MA in 1972 from the School of Oriental and African Studies in London, where she specialized in British colonial history in West Africa. She returned to the United States and in 1984 completed a second MA, this time in international studies, at the University of Denver. In 1989 she was awarded her PhD, also from Denver, for a thesis entitled Black Feminism: A Comparative Study of Women in Ghana and the United States.

== Research ==
James has written about "othermothering" within African-American and West African communities, arguing that they are "critical to the survival of black communities".

In Genital Cutting and Transnational Sisterhood (2010), she criticizes as insensitive the Western approach to eliminating female genital mutilation (FGM). She also argues that feminist approaches to FGM suffer from a "colonial flaw", a failure to recognize that similar practices, in the form of clitoridectomy and surgery on intersex children, have taken place in the United States.

== Selected works ==
- (2022). Stanlie M. James. "Practical Audacity. Black Women in International Human Rights". UW Press. https://uwpress.wisc.edu/books/6025.htm
- (2009). Stanlie M. James. "Barack Obama: Coalitions of a Purple Mandate". SOULS: A Critical Journal of Black Politics, Culture and Society.
- (2009). Stanlie M. James and Beverly Guy-Sheftall, eds. Still Brave: The Evolution of Black Women's Studies. New York: Feminist Press.
- (2002). Stanlie M. James and Claire C. Robertson, eds. Genital Cutting and Transnational Sisterhood: Disputing U.S. Polemics. Urbana and Chicago: University of Illinois Press.
- (2001). Stanlie M. James. "What Shall I tell My Children Who are Black?", Feminist Collections: A Quarterly Journal of Women's Studies Resources, 23(1), Fall, pp. 24–26.
- (1998). James, Stanlie M. "Shades of Othering: Reflections on Female Circumcision/Genital Mutilation", Signs, 23(4), Summer. JSTOR 3175202
- (1993). James, Stanlie M. and A. P. Busia, eds. Theorizing Black Feminism: The Visionary Pragmatism of Black Women. New York: Routledge.
- (1992). James, Stanlie M. "Transgressing Fundamental Boundaries: The Struggle for Women's Human Rights", Africa Today, 39(4). JSTOR 4186861
