= Baby planner =

Type of maternity consultant

A baby planner is a private maternity consultant. They meet with expecting and new parents and offer education, resources and support. They may also recommend products, resources, services, support and additional education for their clients.

Baby planners may work with expecting parents throughout the entire duration of their pregnancy or may meet with them for just a few sessions.

While baby planners are involved with helping expecting parents plan their pregnancies and guiding new parents through the postpartum period, baby planners who do not hold additional medical licensing are not medical professionals and do not provide medical opinions, treatments, examinations or diagnoses.

== Services ==
While each baby planner may have their own list of services that they provide, most services baby planners offer center around educating their clients, referring their clients to specialty service providers and helping their clients to get and stay organized throughout the pregnancy and beyond. Baby Gear consulting is the cornerstone service of baby planners and was first provided as a fee based service when baby planning was created in 2006. However, some baby planners do not specialize in gear consulting and offer a variety of other services to meet a client's need. Baby Planners offer many specialties and should customize their business to meet each client's need.

Services may include:

- Baby registry setup
- Product reviews and suggestions
- Baby shower planning
- Baby announcement selection or design
- Nursery organization
- Layette shopping
- Photo organization
- Child care selection education
- Referrals to service providers (Concierge Services)
- Child proofing
- Newborn care
- Infant car seat installation
- Sleep Consulting
- Green/Eco Consulting
- Doula services
- Postpartum counseling services
- Personal and fitness training
