= Equal Rights Party =

Equal Rights Party may refer to:

- Equal Rights Party (Canada)
- Equal Rights (Latvia)
- Liberia Equal Rights Party
- Equal Rights Party (United States), a women's rights party in the United States in the 19th century
- Locofocos, originally named the Equal Rights Party, active during the 1830s and 1840s in the United States

== See also ==
- Equal rights (disambiguation)
