= International judicial institution =

List of international judicial institutions

International judicial institutions can be divided into courts, arbitral tribunals and quasi-judicial institutions. Courts are permanent bodies, with near the same composition for each case. Arbitral tribunals, by contrast, are constituted anew for each case. Both courts and arbitral tribunals can make binding decisions. Quasi-judicial institutions, by contrast, make rulings on cases, but these rulings are not in themselves legally binding; the main example is the individual complaints mechanisms available under the various UN human rights treaties.

Institutions can also be divided into global and regional institutions.

The listing below incorporates both currently existing institutions, defunct institutions that no longer exist, institutions which never came into existence due to non-ratification of their constitutive instruments, and institutions which do not yet exist, but for which constitutive instruments have been signed. It does not include mere proposed institutions for which no instrument was ever signed.

== International courts ==
- International Court of Justice
- International Tribunal for the Law of the Sea
- International Criminal Tribunal for the Former Yugoslavia
- International Criminal Tribunal for Rwanda
- International Criminal Court
- International Military Tribunal (Defunct)
- International Military Tribunal for the Far East (Defunct)
- International Prize Court (Never established)
- Permanent Court of International Justice (Defunct. Replaced by the International Court of Justice)

== International arbitral tribunals ==
- Permanent Court of Arbitration
- WTO Appellate Body
- WTO Dispute Settlement Panels
- NAFTA Dispute Settlement Panels
- International Centre for the Settlement of Investment Disputes
- Court of Arbitration for Sport
- OSCE Court of Conciliation and Arbitration

== Quasi-judicial international institutions ==
- Human Rights Committee
- Committee on the Elimination of Racial Discrimination
- Committee on the Elimination of Discrimination Against Women
- Committee on Economic, Social and Cultural Rights
- Committee on the Rights of the Child
- Committee Against Torture
- Committee on Migrant Workers
- Committee on the Rights of Persons with Disabilities

== African regional judicial institutions ==
- African Court on Human and Peoples' Rights
- Court of Justice of the African Union (planned)
- Court of Justice of the Common Market for Eastern and Southern Africa
- Community Court of Justice of the Economic Community of West African States
- East African Court of Justice
- Southern African Development Community Tribunal

== Regional judicial institutions of the Americas ==
- Inter-American Court of Human Rights
- Central American Court of Justice
- Court of Justice of the Andean Community
- Caribbean Court of Justice
- Eastern Caribbean Supreme Court

== European regional judicial institutions ==
- European Court of Justice
- European General Court
- European Court of Human Rights
- Court of Justice of the European Free Trade Agreement States
- Benelux Court of Justice
- Economic Court of the Commonwealth of Independent States
- European Nuclear Energy Tribunal (dormant)
- Western European Union Tribunal (defunct)
- European Tribunal in Matters of State Immunity (dormant)
