= Jain law =

Religious law in India

Jain law or Jaina law is the modern interpretation of ancient Jain law that consists of rules for adoption, marriage, succession and death prescribed for the followers of Jainism.

== History ==
=== Ancient ===
Jains regard Bharata Chakravartin as the first law giver of the present half cycle of time. Jains have their own law books. Vardhamana Niti and Ashana Niti by the great Jain teacher Hemachandra deals with Jain law. Bhadrabahu Samhit is also considered an important book on Jaina law.

=== Modern ===
In 1916, Barrister Jagomandar Lal Jaini (1881-1927) published a translation of Bhadrabahu Samhita, which went on to form the basis of modern Jain law. The author mentioned the full text of a judgement that he delivered in Civil Original Case No. 6 of 1914, Indore, in which Jain religious and legal scriptures were explicitly quoted and relied upon. It has been suggested that Jain mendicants kept Jain lawbooks away from the British because of the Jain laws of purity. Jain lawgivers had taken great pains to define violence, and were clear that no form of violence was permitted for Jain mendicants. The lawgivers were not so clear on the conduct of Jain laymen, assuming that a violent situation would not arise amongst a community that was numerically small.

After the Montagu Declaration in 1917, the Jain Political Association was set up by the same circle of predominantly Digambara Jain intellectuals to create a unitary political representation for the Jains. In due course the society intended, after due search of the śāstric literature, to give a definite shape to Jaina Law. The culmination of this effort was the most prominent book on the subject of Jain law, written by Champat Rai Jain.

In 1955, the Government of India subsumed Jain law under Hindu law, though Jain law continues in unofficial and semi-official fora.

== Adoption ==
In 1927, Madras High Court in Gateppa v. Eramma and others reported in AIR 1927 Madras 228, the court held that in Bhadrabahu Samhita, verse 40 empowers a sonless man or woman to take a boy in adoption. Verse 83 empowers a widow to adopt a boy and make over her property to him. Verse 73 was quoted in the judgement-

The virtuous lady may like her husband take to herself a son of a good gotra and instal him on the estate of her husband.

== Marriage ==
Jain Agamas mention that there are five types of marriages. Marriage (vivaha) is fundamentally regarded as a social and moral obligation (grahastya dharma) necessary for laypersons (shravakas) to ensure the continuity of the community and the propagation of the Jain dharma. The texts largely focus on prescribing strict ethical guidelines for the householder life, such as mutual fidelity and brahmacharya (chastity), within the marital context, rather than defining marriage as an essential religious sacrament (samskara) for liberation (moksha). Marriage is often contextualized as a worldly necessity that allows individuals to balance spiritual aspirations with social duty, while simultaneously reminding the faithful that ultimate liberation from the cycle of rebirth (sansar) is achieved through renunciation and asceticism.

== Rights of female heirs ==
The rights of female heir in Jaina law are different from that of Hindu Law. Under the Jaina Law females take the inheritance absolutely. The Jaina law of personal status is exceptional in India by some legal scholars because the provisions of the codified religious law grants also daughters (not just adult females) and sons equal rights in the inheritance of property. The Jain law on female inheritance is codified and laid down in the Badrabahu Samhita, a Digambara text which is also accepted by the Svetambara tradition.

== Succession ==
Upon the death of a person without a son, the property is entirely passed on to the widow. The property remains with the widow even if there were to be a son. This is an important difference between Jain law and Hindu law. In Hindu law, the widow does not have the right to the deceased husband's property. In Jainism, there is no privilege accorded to a male heir, and a widow is treated as a preferential heir to her own son.

== Twin sons ==
According to Jain law, in case of twin born sons, the first born or the eldest is entitled for more privileges at the time of partition.

== Gallery ==
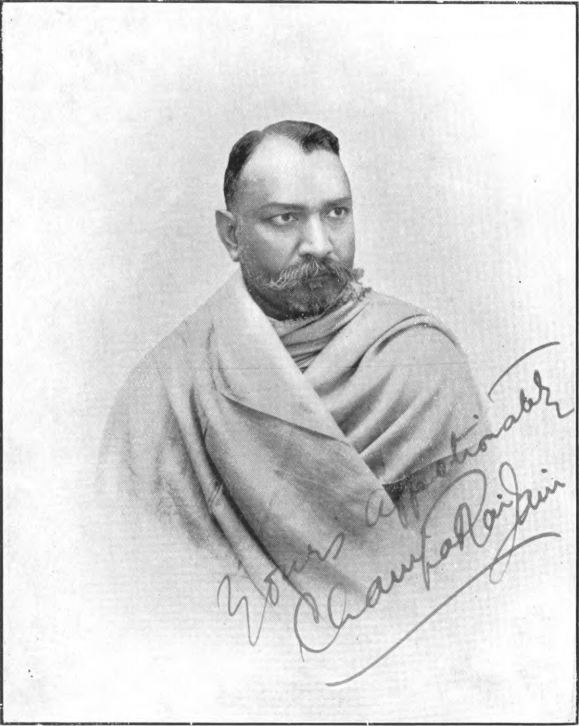
Champat Rai Jain, author of the modern Jaina Law

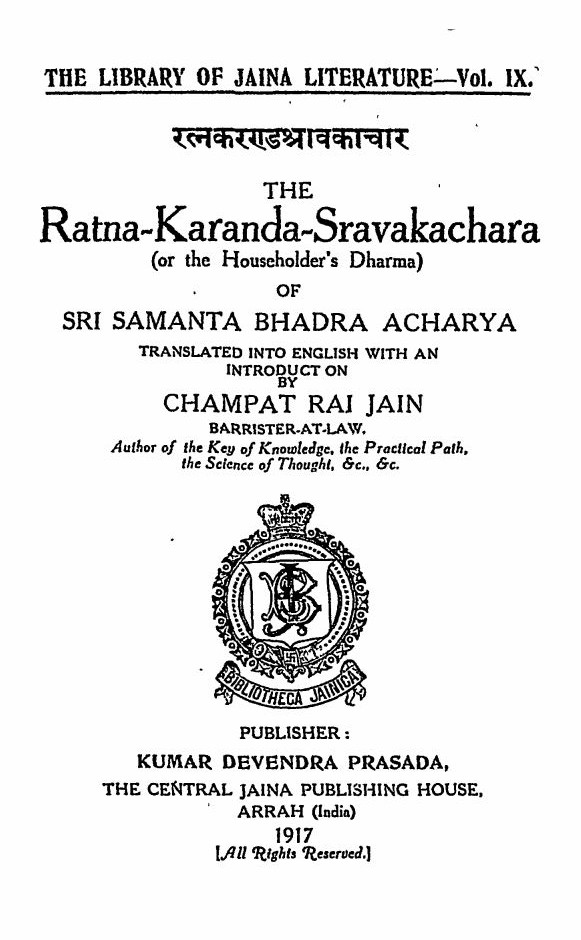
The Householder's Dharma

== See also ==
- Christian personal law
- Hebrew law
- Modern Hindu law
- Classical Hindu law
