= Equal rights =

Equal rights may refer to:

== Philosophy and law ==
- Equality before the law, when all people have the same rights
- Equal Justice Under Law (civil rights organization)
- Human rights, when such rights are held in common by all people
- Civil rights, when such rights are held in common by all citizens of a nation
- Rights guaranteed under gender equality, proposed variously:
  - by the women's rights movement growing out of women's suffrage
  - by the men's rights movement growing out of the men's movement
- Equal Rights Amendment, a proposed amendment to the U.S. Constitution that intended to advance such a condition for women's rights
- Law of equal liberty, a moral principle described by Herbert Spencer

== Other uses ==
- "Equal Rights", a 1953 episode of the sitcom I Love Lucy (1951–1957)
- Equal Rights (album), a 1977 reggae release by Peter Tosh
- Equal Rights (journal), a 1920s feminist journal; see Mildred Seydell
- Equal Rights Beyond Borders, a charitable organisation which assists towards the legal rights of refugees
- Equal Rights (motto), the motto of the state of Wyoming, USA

== See also ==
- Equal Rights Party (disambiguation)
- Equality (disambiguation)
- Social equality
- Equal Rites, a novel by Terry Pratchett
