= Prize court =

Court to rule on prizes of war

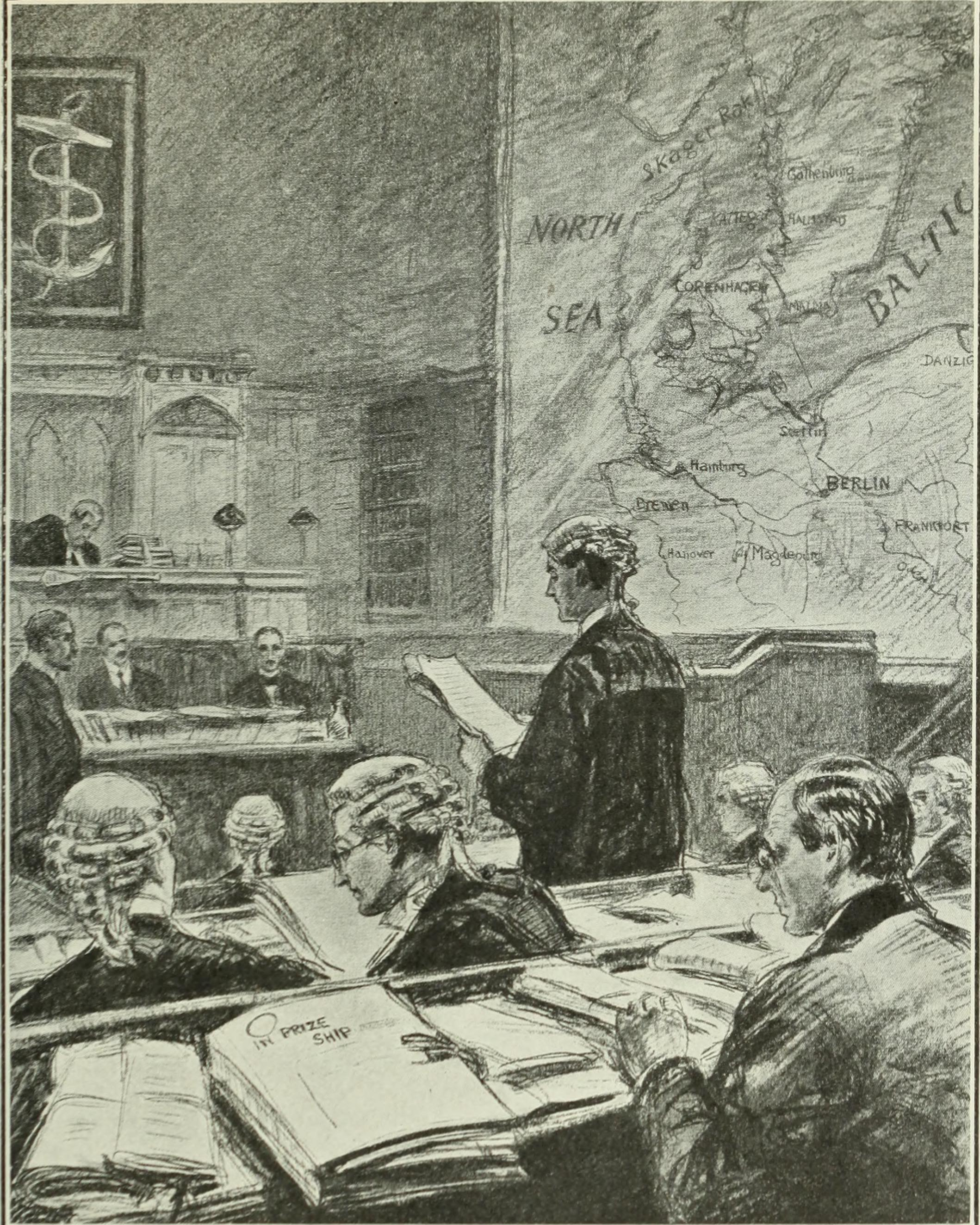
British prize court in World War I

A prize court is a court (or even a single individual, such as an ambassador or consul) authorized to consider whether prizes have been lawfully captured, typically whether a ship has been lawfully captured or seized in time of war or under the terms of the seizing ship's letters of marque and reprisal. A prize court may order the sale or destruction of the seized ship, and the distribution of any proceeds to the captain and crew of the seizing ship. A prize court may also order the return of a seized ship to its owners if the seizure was unlawful, such as if seized from a country which had proclaimed its neutrality.

== History/jurisdiction in various countries ==
Prize courts were common in the 17th through 19th centuries, during times of American or European naval warfare.

=== United States ===
In 1780, the United States established the Federal Court of Appeals in Cases of Capture to hear appeals of prize cases from state prize courts; this court was ended in 1787, after conclusion of the war. Under current U.S. law, pursuant to 10 U.S.C. §§ 7651–7681, the district courts have exclusive jurisdiction in prize cases. Due to changes in the nature of naval warfare, no prize cases have been heard since the statutes were adopted in 1956.

In 2026, the U.S. Navy and the U.S. Justice Department were reported to be pursuing reintroduction of prize courts, citing the difficulty and time commitment involved with civil asset forfeiture of ships and oil seized in the 2026 Iran war in existing courts. Legal experts stated that, while the laws existed and were enforcable in times of war, it was questionable if the laws could be enforced if Congress had not declared war. The United States District Court for the Southern District of Texas was requested by the Justice Department to develop modern procedures and requirements for holding prize courts, which were made available in November 2026. No dates were provided as to when prize court may be implemented.

=== United Kingdom ===
In England and Wales, prize jurisdiction is exercised by the Admiralty Court, part of the King's Bench Division of the High Court of Justice (see Prize Courts Act 1894 and Senior Courts Act 1981, ss. 20(1)(d), 27 and 62(2)), and by way of appeal to the Judicial Committee of the Privy Council.

An important factor in the diminishing importance of prize courts was the adoption of the navicert system for managing the British blockades in WWI and WWII.

=== France ===
In France, the prize council (Conseil des prises) has jurisdiction to determine the issue of the prize. Since 2007, piracy has been transferred to criminal courts. The council's jurisdiction is reduced to war time. The way of appeal is open to the President of the French Republic acting as judge.

=== International ===
The International Prize Court was an international court proposed at the beginning of the 20th century, to hear prize cases. An international agreement, the Convention Relative to the Creation of an International Prize Court, was established at The Hague on October 18, 1907, but this was never ratified or implemented.
