= International Prize Court =

Proposed international court

The International Prize Court was an international court proposed at the beginning of the 20th century, to hear prize cases. An international agreement to create it, the Convention Relative to the Creation of an International Prize Court, was made at the Second Hague Conference in 1907 but never came into force.

The capturing of prizes (enemy equipment, vehicles, and especially ships) during wartime is a tradition that goes back as far as organized warfare itself. The International Prize Court was established hear appeals from national courts concerning prize cases. Even as a draft, the convention was innovative for the time, in being both the first ever treaty for a truly international court (as opposed to a mere arbitral tribunal), and in providing individuals with access to the court, going against the prevailing doctrines of international law at the time, according to which only states had rights and duties under international law. The convention was opposed, particularly by elements within the United States and the United Kingdom, as a violation of national sovereignty.

The 1907 convention was modified by the Additional Protocol to the Convention Relative to the Creation of an International Prize Court, done at the Hague on October 18, 1910. The protocol was an attempt to resolve some concerns expressed by the United States at the court, which felt it to be in violation of its constitutional provision that provides for the U.S. Supreme Court being the final judicial authority. However, neither the convention nor the subsequent protocol ever entered into force, since only Nicaragua ratified the agreements. As a result, the court never came into existence.

On February 15, 1911, the U.S. Senate ratified the International Prize Court Convention.

A number of ideas from the International Prize Court proposal can be seen in present-day international courts, such as its provision for judges ad hoc, later adopted in the Permanent Court of International Justice and the subsequent International Court of Justice.
