= Othermother =

Woman caring for children who are not biologically her own

An othermother is a woman caring for children who are not biologically her own.

== Scope ==
Othermothers are women, including mothers, who provide care for children who are not biologically their own. The practice has been documented in Africa and the African diaspora, including in the United States and the Caribbean region. Rooted in West African tradition, othermothering can including child-rearing outside of the home, including in educational settings. It is also commonly multigenerational, with multiple othermothers for a single child.

In some regions, othermothering is known as "child fostering," though not in the strictly legal sense of foster care.

=== Canada ===
In Canada, othermothers are often found in multigenerational households or organizations and emphasize community approaches to caretaking. Canadian othermothers help introduce new members of the African diaspora to their surroundings and get people involved in Afrocentric community activism.

Black students in Canadian universities seek out othermother figures within the faculty, especially to serve as academic advisors for Afrocentric research, meaning Black women faculty members become responsible for students' intellectual, emotional, and physical well-being.

=== Caribbean ===
Although the term "othermother" is most commonly associated with Black women, the concept is also found in Latin America and its diaspora, which includes people of African heritage. In the Caribbean, the terms macoumere/MaComère and comadre are used in non-Anglophone communities.

Othermother characters are common in Caribbean literature, where they help provide multigenerational views of women's experiences. Othermother characters are also used to explore different types of motherhood and how mothering is affected by colonialism.

In Caribbean film, othermothering is used to critique U.S. approaches to family units and parenting, especially the idealized "nuclear family" that lacks the Caribbean region's "more complex structural relationships such as the concept and practice of the extended family or community involvement in parenting practices."

=== United States ===
The institution of othermothers was a common practice in African-American communities in America since early as slavery and has roots in the traditional African world-view. "Care" could be in the form of providing a meal, essentially adopting the child, or simply supplying guidance. Othermothers believed that "good mothering" comprises all actions, including social activism, which addressed the needs of their biological children as well as the greater community.

Stanlie M. James defines the concept of the community othermother as the women in African-American communities who assist blood mothers in the responsibilities in child care for short to long-term periods, in informal or formal arrangements. James finds that othermothers are usually over the age of 40 because they must have a sense of the community's culture and tradition before they can exercise their care and wisdom on the community. Othermothers are politically active in their community, as they critique members and provide strategies to improve their environment.

A study by sociologist Cheryl Gilkes examines women leaders in a Northern, urban community. Gilkes suggests that community othermother relationships can be essential in stimulating black women's decisions to become social activists. Many of the black women community activists in her study became involved in community organizing in response to the needs of their own children and of those in the neighborhood.

Patricia Hill Collins discusses the othermother relationship and references Gilkes study. Patricia Hill Collins explains othermothers as women who held the family infrastructure together by their virtues of caring, ethics, teaching, and community service. They can be sisters, aunts, neighbors, grandmothers, cousins, or any other woman who steps in to relieve some stress of intimate mother-daughter relationships. They are considered to be the backbone of the black race and give anything that they can to communities, and often what they cannot. Collins also discusses the "mothering the mind" relationships that can develop between black othermothers and other females who effectively become their students. These relationships move toward the mutuality of a shared sisterhood that binds black women as community othermothers. Community othermothers have made dramatic contributions by creating a new type of community in often hostile political and economic situations. Collins concludes by stating that othermothers' participation in activist mothering demonstrates a rejection of individualism and adapts a different value system where ethics of caring and personal accountability move communities forward.

Today, the concept of the othermother is present within the urban elementary schools, and African-American female educators play an integral role in fulfilling the psychological and educational needs of the urban child.

== See also ==
- Black matriarchy
- Coparenting
- Interpersonal relationship
- LGBT parenting
- Second parent adoption
