= Mothers' rights =

Legal obligations mothers are entitled to

Mothers' rights are the legal obligations for expecting mothers, existing mothers, and adoptive mothers. Issues that involve mothers' rights include labor rights, breast feeding, and family rights.

== Universal Declaration of Human Rights ==
Mother's rights are enshrined in Article 25 of the Universal Declaration of Human Rights:

2. Motherhood and childhood are entitled to special care and assistance. All children, whether born in or out of wedlock, shall enjoy the same social protection.

— Universal Declaration of Human Rights, Article 25

== Labor rights ==
Labor rights for mothers in the United States consist of maternal leave during the various stages of pregnancy as well as when the baby is born and afterwards. They also include work procedures for new mothers returning to their workplace after giving birth. The time women are allowed to take off for childbirth is referred to as maternity leave. Each state and company has its own laws regarding the allotted time allowed off for family leave, as well as any other support given to new mothers. The Family and Medical Leave Act of 1993 (FMLA) has set laws for companies across the board setting the minimum requirements for maternity leave. The regulations set by FMLA apply to mothers, fathers, and adoptive parents. The act requires most companies to allow up to 12 weeks of non-paid family leave. Furthermore, many countries legally forbid women to work. Some cannot leave their horses or travel without a husband's permission. While the US may have laws for women in the work force, some countries do not even allow them.

Furthermore, US Law protects workers against harassment of and employers that discriminate against a worker based on being pregnant, if they were pregnant, or intend to become pregnant under the Pregnancy Discrimination Act (PDA) and the Americans with Disabilities Act (ADA). Pregnant workers may also be able to request adjustments in their workdays to accommodate their health such as breaks to the bathroom.

== Breast feeding ==
Breast feeding is the act of supplying nutrients to an infant with human breast milk by means of breast or bottle. There are specific laws in place in each state regarding breast feeding as well as federal laws. Every U.S state except for Idaho has a law that allows women to breast-feed in any public or private location. Although the majority of states allow breast feeding anywhere, only 29 states exempt breast feeding from public indecency laws, meaning the exposure of nudity in public. The federal laws concerning breast feeding mothers relate to working mothers. Once mothers return to work there are also laws set in place for nursing mothers while they are at work. Employers are required to allow these mothers reasonable break time when they express the need to discard their milk supply for up to a year after they have given birth. They are also required to provide a private and secluded place, other than a restroom, for these mothers to discard their milk supply. These laws can be found in The Patient Protection and Affordable Care Act of 2010.

== Family rights for mothers ==
Mother's have many rights that relate to family law including making decisions on behalf of their children including medical decisions as well as who is around their child. Mother's also have the legal right to pursue their child's father for child support.

=== Parents' rights ===
Although for many years mothers would get immediate custody of their children in the case of a divorce due to their maternal status, that is not the case anymore. Legally, the state needs to look at every individual case and make a decision based on the best interests of the child. Mothers remain the primary caretaker, as states look for that to determine custody.. Each state has their own specific laws regarding a mother's legal rights and responsibility to her child. All legal statutes declare that the mother or parents are allowed to make the decisions regarding a child's education, religion, medical care, and deciding where the child will live. A biological mother, fathers married to the mother before or after the child's birth, and as of 2003, fathers on their child's birth certificate are automatically given this legal right for their child. The most common agreement after a divorce is joint custody for the parents, not that joint custody is easy on either side of a divorce, but it is the route most divorcees go.

=== Child custody and support ===
Although a mother has certain custody rights when there is a battle for custody it is still the court's responsibility to choose the best circumstance for the child. The most common agreement after a divorce is joint custody for the parents. Single mothers who are living in a state with joint custody laws have lower family income, but a lower personal income as well. Single mothers in an adoptive state are 1.8% more likely to live in poverty.
