= Commercial revolution =

Revolution

In European history, the commercial revolution saw the development of a European economy – based on trade – which began in the 11th century AD and operated until the advent of the Industrial Revolution in the mid-18th century. The Crusades from around 1100 exposed Europeans to spices, silks, and other commodities then rare in Europe. Consumer demand fostered the expansion of trade. Newly forming European states, through voyages of discovery, investigated alternative trade routes in the 15th and 16th centuries, which allowed European powers to build vast international trade networks. Nations also sought new sources of wealth and practiced mercantilism and colonialism. The Commercial Revolution is marked by an increase in general commerce, and in the growth of financial services such as banking, insurance, and investing.

== Origins of the commercial revolution ==
The term itself was used by Karl Polanyi in his The Great Transformation: "Politically, the centralized state was a new creation called forth by the Commercial Revolution...". Later the economic historian Roberto Sabatino Lopez, used it to shift focus away from the English Industrial Revolution. In his best-known book, The Commercial Revolution of the Middle Ages (1971, with numerous reprints), Lopez argued that the key contribution of the medieval period to European history was the creation of a commercial economy between the 11th and the 14th century, centered at first in the Italo-Byzantine eastern Mediterranean, but eventually extending to the Italian city-states and over the rest of Europe. This kind of economy ran from approximately the 14th century through the 18th century. Walt Whitman Rostow placed the beginning "arbitrarily" in 1488, the year the first European sailed around the Cape of Good Hope. Most historians, including scholars such as Robert Sabatino Lopez, Angeliki Laiou, Irving W. Raymond, and Peter Spufford indicate that there was a commercial revolution of the 11th through 13th centuries, or that it began at this point, rather than later.

=== Maritime republics and communes ===
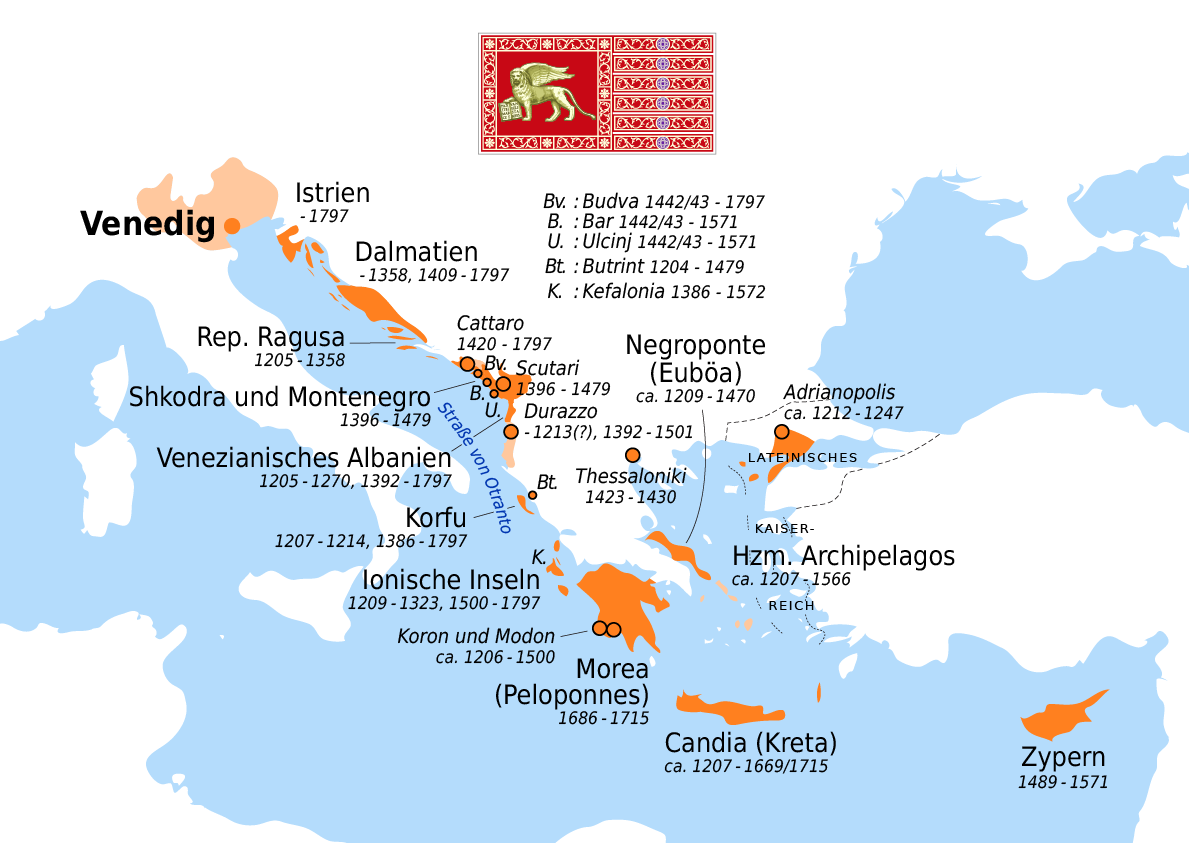
The Venetian Empire

Italy first felt huge economic changes in Europe from the 11th to the 13th centuries. Typically there was:

- a rise in population―the population doubled in this period (the demographic explosion)
- an emergence of large cities (Venice, Florence and Milan had over 100,000 inhabitants by the 13th century in addition to many others such as Genoa, Bologna and Verona, which had over 50,000 inhabitants)
- the rebuilding of the great cathedrals
- substantial migration from country to city (in Italy the rate of urbanization reached 20%, making it the most urbanized society in the world at that time)
- an agrarian revolution
- the development of commerce

In recent writing on the city states, American scholar Rodney Stark emphasizes that they married responsive government, Christianity and the birth of capitalism. He argues that Italy consisted of mostly independent towns, who prospered through commerce based on early capitalist principles and kept both direct Church control and imperial power at arm's length.

Cambridge University historian and political philosopher Quentin Skinner has pointed out how Otto of Freising, a German bishop who visited central Italy during the 12th century, commented that Italian towns had appeared to have exited from feudalism, so that their society was based on merchants and commerce. Even northern cities and states were also notable for their maritime republics, especially the Republic of Venice and Genoa. Compared to absolutist monarchies or other more centrally controlled states, the Italian communes and commercial republics enjoyed relative political freedom conducive to academic and artistic advancement. Geographically, and because of trade, Italian cities such as Venice became international trading and banking hubs and intellectual crossroads.

Harvard historian Niall Ferguson points out that Florence and Venice, as well as several other Italian city-states, played a crucial innovative role in world financial developments, devising the main instruments and practices of banking and the emergence of new forms of social and economic organization.

It is estimated that the per capita income of northern Italy nearly tripled from the 11th century to the 15th century. This was a highly mobile, demographically expanding society, fueled by the rapidly expanding Renaissance commerce.

In the 14th century, just as the Italian Renaissance was beginning, Italy was the economic capital of Western Europe: the Italian States were the top manufacturers of finished woolen products. However, with the Black Death in 1348, the birth of the English woolen industry and general warfare, Italy temporarily lost its economic advantage. However, by the late 15th century Italy was again in control of trade along the Mediterranean Sea. It found a new niche in luxury items like ceramics, glassware, lace and silk as well as experiencing a temporary rebirth in the woolen industry.

During the 11th century in northern Italy a new political and social structure emerged: the city-state or commune. The civic culture which arose from this urbs was remarkable. In some places where communes arose (e.g. Britain and France), they were absorbed by the monarchical state as it emerged. They survived in northern and central Italy as in a handful of other regions throughout Europe to become independent and powerful city-states. In Italy the breakaway from their feudal overlords occurred in the late 12th century and 13th century, during the Investiture controversy between the Pope and the Holy Roman Emperor: Milan led the Lombard cities against the Holy Roman Emperors and defeated them, gaining independence (battles of Legnano, 1176, and Parma, 1248; see Lombard League).

Similar town revolts led to the foundation of city-states throughout medieval Europe, such as in Russia (Novgorod Republic, 12th century), in Flanders (Battle of Golden Spurs, 14th century) in Switzerland (the towns of the Old Swiss Confederacy, 14th century), in Germany (the Hanseatic League, 14th–15th century), and in Prussia (Thirteen Years' War, 15th century).

Some Italian city-states became great military powers very early on. Venice and Genoa acquired vast naval empires in the Mediterranean and Black Seas, some of which threatened those of the growing Ottoman Empire. During the Fourth Crusade (1204), Venice conquered a quarter of the Byzantine Empire.

The Maritime Republics were one of the main products of this new civic and social culture based on commerce and exchange of knowledge with other areas of the world outside western Europe. The Republic of Ragusa and the Republic of Venice, for example, had important trade communications with the Muslim and Hindu world and this helped the initial development of the Italian Renaissance.

By the late 12th century, a new and remarkable society had emerged in Northern Italy, rich, mobile, and expanding, with a mixed aristocracy and urban borghese (burgher) class, interested in urban institutions and republican government. But many of the new city-states also housed violent factions based on family, confraternity and brotherhood, who undermined their cohesion (for instance the Guelphs and Ghibellines).

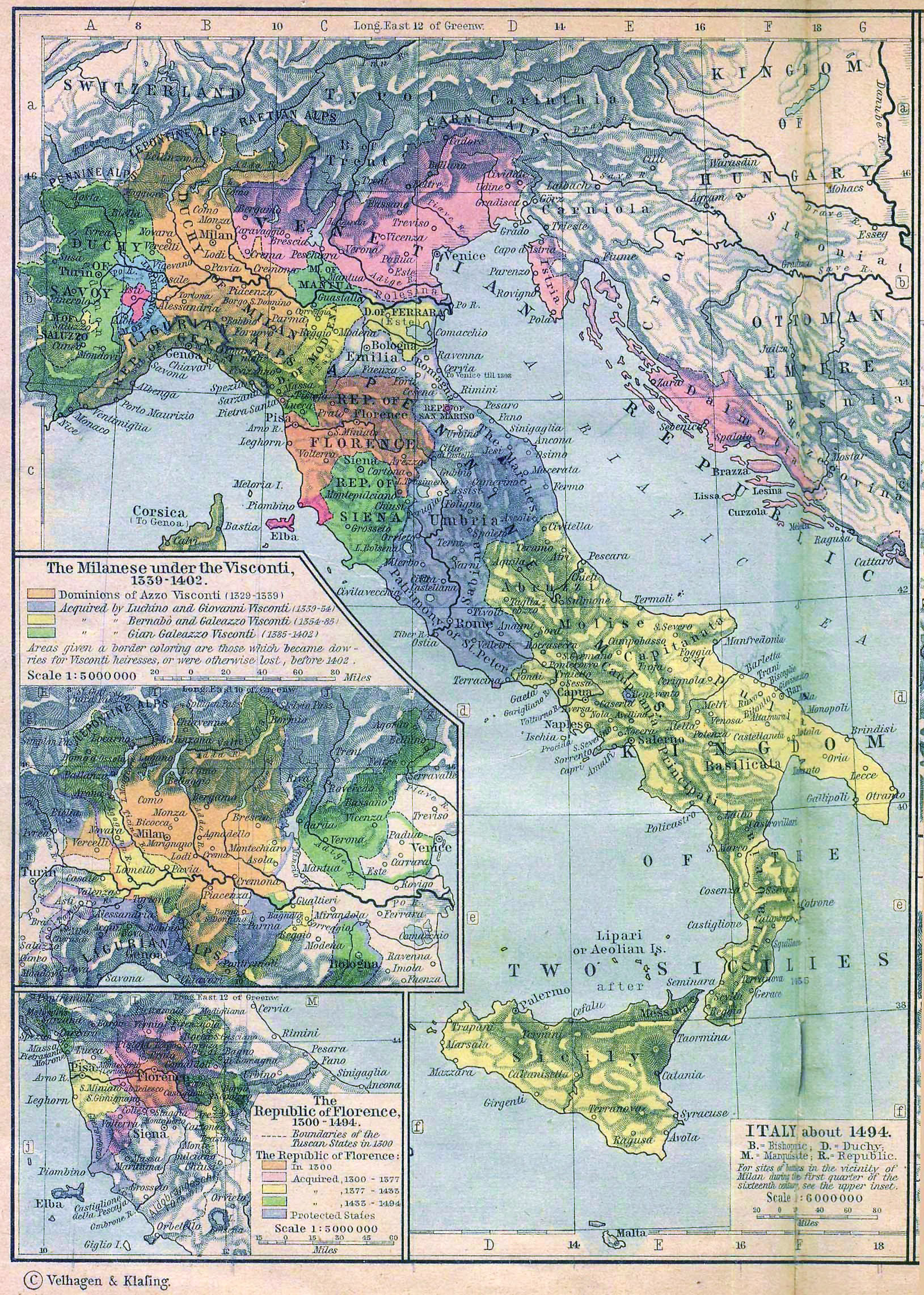
Italy in 1494, after the Peace of Lodi

By 1300, most of these republics had become princely states dominated by a Signore. The exceptions were Venice, Florence, Lucca, and a few others, which remained republics in the face of an increasingly monarchic Europe. In many cases by 1400 the Signori were able to found a stable dynasty over their dominated city (or group of regional cities), obtaining also a nobility title of sovereignty by their formal superior, for example in 1395 Gian Galeazzo Visconti bought for 100,000 gold florins the title of Duke of Milan from the emperor Wenceslaus.

In the fourteenth and fifteenth centuries, Milan, Venice, and Florence were able to conquer other city-states, creating regional states. The 1454 Peace of Lodi ended their struggle for hegemony in Italy, attaining a balance of power and creating the conditions for the artistic and intellectual changes produced by the Italian Renaissance.

== Colonialism and mercantilism ==
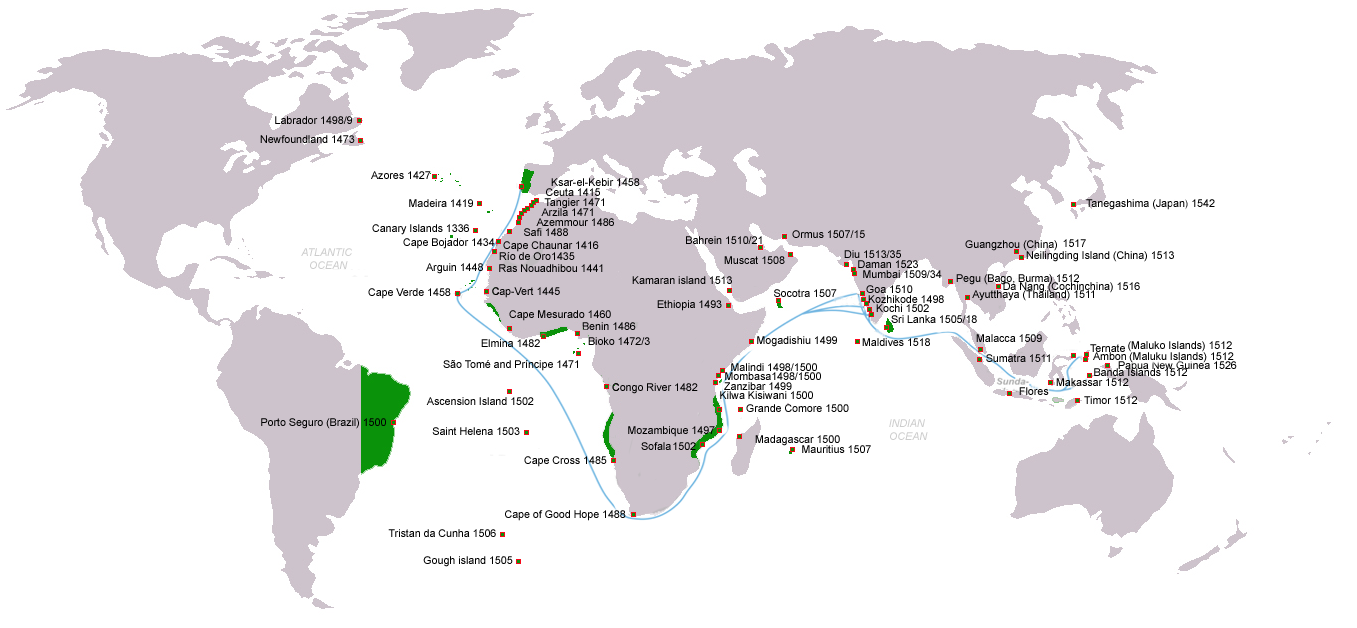
Portuguese discoveries and explorations from 1415 to 1543: first arrival places and dates; main Portuguese spice trade routes in the Indian Ocean (in blue); territories of the Portuguese Empire under the rule of King John III (1521–1557) (in green).

The deterioration of the climate that brought about the end of the medieval warm period (or medieval weather anomaly) caused an economic decline at the beginning of the 14th century (see Great Famine). However, demographic expansion continued until the arrival of the Black Death epidemic in 1347, when ca. 50% of the European population was killed by the plague. The economic effects of a labor shortage actually caused wages to rise, while agricultural yields were once again able to support a diminished population. By the beginning of the 15th century, the economic expansion associated with the commercial revolution in earlier centuries returned in full force, aided by improvements in navigation and cartography.

Geopolitical, monetary, and technological factors drove the Age of Discovery. During this period (1450–17th century), the European economic center shifted from the Islamic Mediterranean to Western Europe (Portugal, Spain, France, the Netherlands, and to some extent England). This shift was caused by the successful circumnavigation of Africa, which opened up sea-trade with the east: after Portugal's Vasco da Gama rounded the Cape of Good Hope and landed in Calicut, India in May 1498, a new path of eastern trade was possible, ending the monopoly of the Ottoman Turks and the Italian city-states. The wealth of the Indies was now open for the Europeans to explore; the Portuguese Empire was one of the early European empires to grow from spice trade. Following this, Portugal became the controlling state for trade between east and west, followed later by the Dutch city of Antwerp. Direct maritime trade between Europe and China started in the 16th century, after the Portuguese established the settlement of Goa, India in December 1510, and thereafter that of Macau in southern China in 1557. Since the English came late to the transatlantic trade, their commercial revolution was later as well.

=== Geopolitical factors ===
In 1453, the Ottoman Turks took over Constantinople, which cut off (or significantly increased the cost of) overland trade routes between Europe and the Far East, so alternative routes had to be found. English laws were changed to benefit the navy, but had commercial implications in terms of farming. These laws also contributed to the demise of the Hanseatic League, which traded in northern Europe. Because of the Reconquista, the Spanish had a warrior culture ready to conquer still more people and places, so Spain was perfectly positioned to develop their vast overseas empire. Rivalry between the European powers produced intense competition for the creation of colonial empires, and fueled the rush to sail out of Europe.

=== Monetary factors ===
The need for silver coinage also affected the desire for expanded exploration as silver and gold were spent for trade to the Middle and Far East. The Europeans had a constant deficit in that silver and gold coin only went one way: out of Europe, spent on the very type of trade that they were now cut off from by the Ottomans.

Another issue was that European mines were exhausted of silver ore and gold. What ore remained was too deep to recover, as water would fill the mine, and technology was not sufficiently advanced enough to successfully remove the water to get to the ore or gold.

A second argument is that trade during the youth of the commercial revolution blossomed not due to explorations for bullion (gold and silver coinings) but due to a newfound faith in gold coinage. Italian city-states such as Genoa and Florence (where the first gold coins began to be minted in 1252) and kingdoms such as the Kingdom of Sicily routinely received gold through such trading partners as Tunisia and Senegal. A new, stable and universally accepted coinage that was both compatible with traditional European coinage systems and serviced the increased demand for currency to facilitate trade made it even more lucrative to carry out trade with the rest of the world.

=== Technological factors ===
In 1570 (May 20) Gilles Coppens de Diest at Antwerp published 53 maps created by Abraham Ortelius under the title Theatrum Orbis Terrarum, considered the "first modern atlas". Latin editions, besides Dutch, French and German editions appeared before the end of 1572; the atlas continued to be in demand until about 1612. This is the world map from this atlas.

From the 16th to 18th centuries, Europeans made remarkable maritime innovations. These innovations enabled them to expand overseas and set up colonies, most notably during the 16th and 17th centuries. They developed new sail arrangements for ships, skeleton-based shipbuilding, the Western "galea" (at the end of the 11th century), sophisticated navigational instruments, and detailed charts and maps. After Isaac Newton published the Principia, navigation was transformed, because sailors could predict the motion of the moon and other celestial objects using Newton's theories of motion. Starting in 1670, the entire world was measured using essentially modern latitude instruments. In 1676, the British Parliament declared that navigation was the greatest scientific problem of the age and in 1714 offered a substantial financial prize for the solution to finding longitude. This spurred the development of the marine chronometer, the lunar distance method and the invention of the octant after 1730. By the late 18th century, navigators replaced their prior instruments with octants and sextants.

=== Important people ===
Significant contributors to European exploration include Prince Henry the Navigator of Portugal, who was the first of the Europeans to venture out into the Atlantic Ocean, in 1420. Others are Bartolomeu Dias, who first rounded the Cape of Good Hope; Vasco da Gama, who sailed directly to India from Portugal; Ferdinand Magellan, the first to circumnavigate the Earth; Christopher Columbus, who significantly encountered the Americas; Jacques Cartier, who sailed for France, looking for the Northwest Passage; and others.

=== Key Features ===
The economy of the Roman Empire had been based on money, but after the Empire's fall, money became scarce; power and wealth became strictly land based, and local fiefs were (at least theoretically) self-sufficient. Because trade was dangerous and expensive, there were not many traders, and not much trade. The scarcity of money did not help; however, the European economic system had begun to change in the 14th century, partially as a result of the Black Death, and the Crusades.

Banks, stock exchanges, and insurance became ways to manage the risk involved in the renewed trade. New laws came into being. Travel became safer as nations developed. Economic theories began to develop in light of all of the new trading activity. The commercial revolution is also marked by the formalization of pre-existing, informal methods of dealing with trade and commerce.

=== Inflation ===
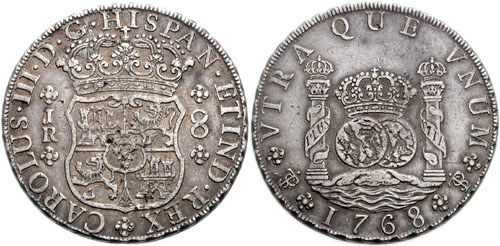
Potosí (Bolivia) silver 8 reales, Carlos III, 1768

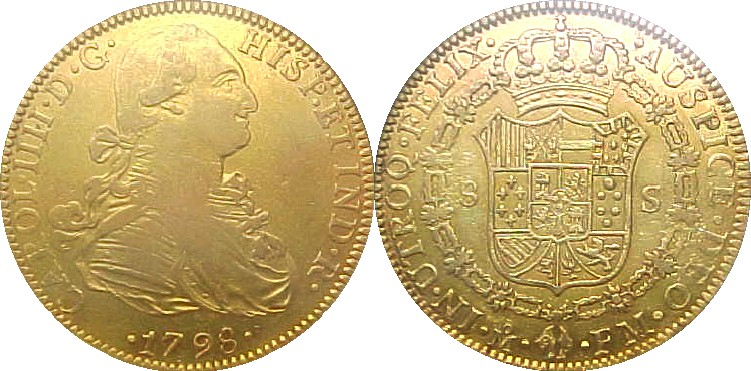
Spanish gold doubloon stamped as minted in 1798

Spain legally amassed approximately 180 tons of gold and 8200 tons of silver through its endeavors in the New World, and another unknown amount through smuggling, spending this money to finance wars and the arts. The spent silver, suddenly being spread throughout a previously cash starved Europe, caused widespread inflation. The inflation was worsened by a growing population but a static production level, low employee salaries and a rising cost of living. This problem, combined with underpopulation (caused by the Black Death), affected the system of agriculture. The landholding aristocracy suffered under the inflation, since they depended on paying small, fixed wages to peasant tenants that were becoming able to demand higher wages. The aristocracy made failed attempts to counteract this situation by creating short-term leases of their lands to allow periodic revaluation of rent. The manorial system (manor system of lord and peasant tenant) eventually vanished, and the landholding aristocrats were forced to sell pieces of their land to maintain their style of living. Such sales transferred ownership to wealthy commoners, who wanted to buy land and thereby increase their social status. Former "common lands" were fenced by the landed gentry, a process known as "enclosure" which subsidized the cost of raising livestock (mainly sheep's wool for the textile industry). This "enclosure" forced the peasants out of rural areas and into the cities, resulting in urbanization. The increase in the availability of silver coin allowed for commerce to expand in numerous ways.

=== Banks ===
The Moneylender and his Wife (1514) Oil on panel, 71 x 68 cm Musée du Louvre, Paris

Various legal and religious developments in the late Middle Ages allowed for development of the modern banking system at the beginning of the 16th century. Interest was allowed to be charged, and profits generated from holding other people's money.

Banks in the Italian Peninsula had great difficulty operating at the end of the 14th century, for lack of silver and gold coin. Nevertheless, by the later 16th century, enough bullion was available that many more people could keep a small amount hoarded and used as capital.

In response to this extra available money, northern European banking interests came along; among them was the Fugger family. The Fuggers were originally weavers and cloth merchants, but soon became involved in banking, charging interest, and other financial activities. They dealt with everyone, from small-time individuals, to the highest nobility. Their banks even loaned to the emperors and kings, eventually going bankrupt when their clients defaulted. This family, and other individuals, used Italian methods which outpaced the Hanseatic League's ability to keep up with the changes occurring in northern Europe.

Antwerp had one of the first money exchanges in Europe, a Bourse, where people could change currency. After the Siege of Antwerp (1584-1585), the majority of business transactions were moved to Amsterdam. The Bank of Amsterdam, following the example of a private Stockholm corporation, began issuing paper money to lessen the difficulty of trade, replacing metal (coin and bullion) in exchanges. In 1609 the Amsterdamsche Wisselbank (Amsterdam Exchange Bank) was founded which made Amsterdam the financial center of the world until the Industrial Revolution. In a notable example of crossover between stock companies and banks, the Bank of England, which opened in 1694, was a joint-stock company.

Banking offices were usually located near centers of trade, and in the late 17th century, the largest centers for commerce were the ports of Amsterdam, London, and Hamburg. Individuals could participate in the lucrative East India trade by purchasing bills of credit from these banks, but the price they received for commodities was dependent on the ships returning (which often did not happen on time) and on the cargo they carried (which often was not according to plan). The commodities market was very volatile for this reason, and also because of the many wars that led to cargo seizures and loss of ships.

=== Managing risk ===
Trade in this period was a risky business: war, weather, and other uncertainties often kept merchants from making a profit, and frequently an entire cargo would disappear all together. To mitigate this risk, the wealthy got together to share the risk through stock: people would own shares of a venture, so that if there was a loss, it would not be an all consuming loss costing the individual investor everything in one transaction.

Other ways of dealing with the risk and expense associated with all of the new trade activity include insurance and joint stock companies which were created as formal institutions. People had been informally sharing risk for hundreds of years, but the formal ways they were now sharing risk was new.

Even though the ruling classes would not often directly assist in trade endeavors, and individuals were unequal to the task, rulers such as Henry VIII of England established a permanent Royal Navy, with the intention of reducing piracy, and protecting English shipping.

==== Joint stock companies and stock exchanges ====
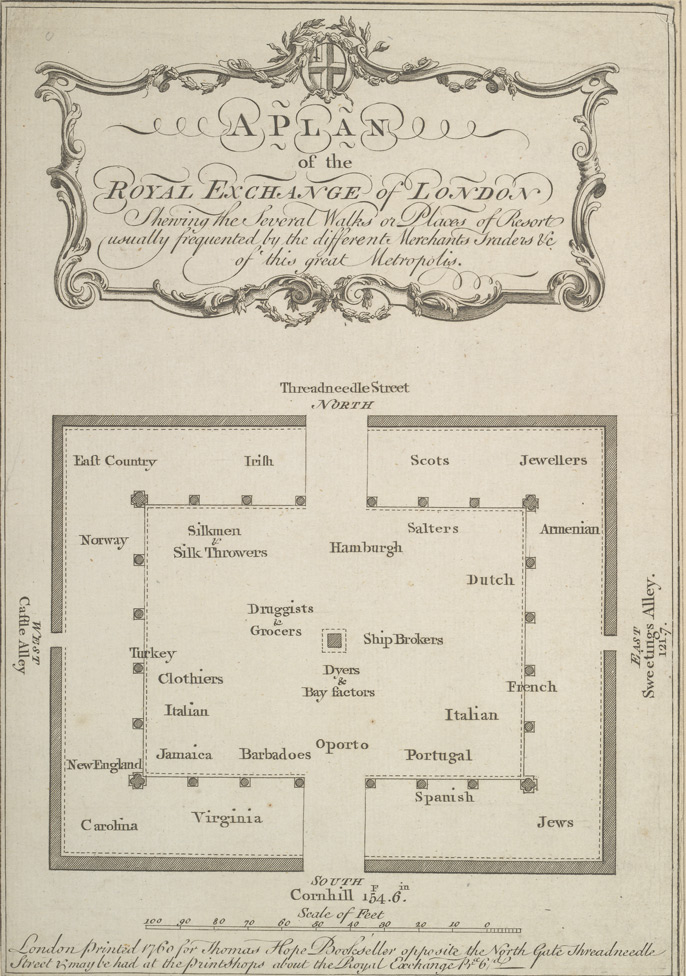
Plan of the London Royal Exchange in 1760

Stock exchanges were developed as the volume of stock transactions increased. The London Royal Exchange established in 1565 first developed as a securities market, though by 1801 it had become a stock exchange.

Historian Fernand Braudel suggests that in Cairo in the 11th-century Muslim and Jewish merchants had already set up every form of trade association and had knowledge of every method of credit and payment, disproving the belief that these were invented later by Italians. In 12th century France the courratiers de change were concerned with managing and regulating the debts of agricultural communities on behalf of the banks. Because these men also traded with debts, they could be called the first brokers. In late 13th century Bruges commodity traders gathered inside the house of a man called Van der Beurse, and in 1309 they became the "Bruges Beurse", institutionalizing what had been, until then, an informal meeting. The idea quickly spread around Flanders and neighboring counties and "Beurzen" soon opened in Ghent and Amsterdam.

"In the middle of the 13th century Venetian bankers began to trade in government securities. In 1351 the Venetian government outlawed spreading rumors intended to lower the price of government funds." Bankers in Pisa, Verona, Genoa and Florence also began trading in government securities during the 14th century. This practice was only possible, because these independent city states were not ruled by a duke but a council of influential citizens. The Dutch later started joint stock companies, which let shareholders invest in business ventures and get a share of their profits – or losses. In 1602, the Dutch East India Company issued the first shares on the Amsterdam Stock Exchange. It was the first company to issue stocks and bonds.

The Amsterdam Stock Exchange (or Amsterdam Beurs) is also said to have been the first stock exchange to introduce continuous trade in the early 17th century. The Dutch "pioneered short selling, option trading, debt-equity swaps, merchant banking, unit trusts and other speculative instruments, much as we know them."

==== Insurance companies ====
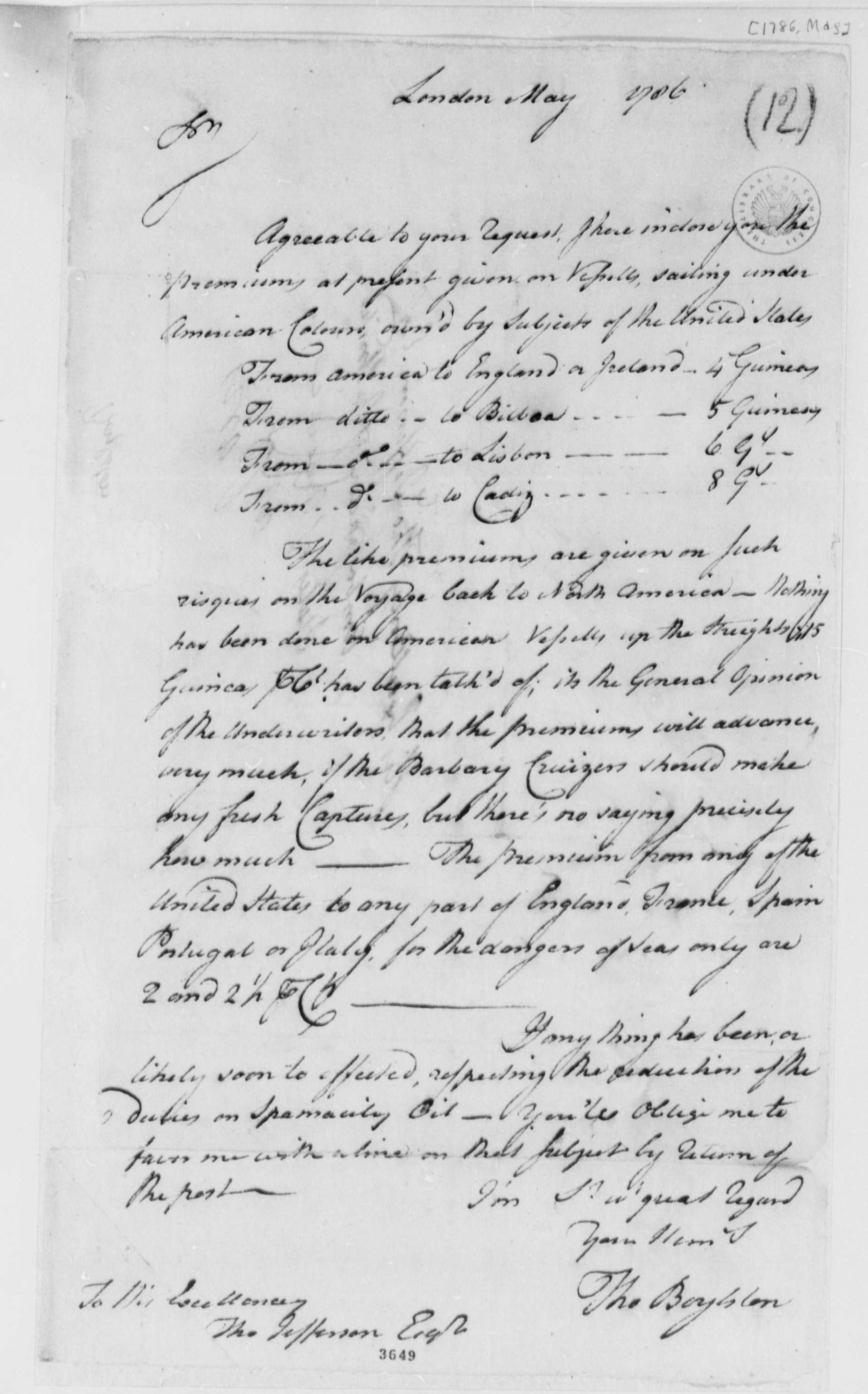
A sample insurance contract. Documents such as this helped traders survive losses.

Insurance companies were another way to mitigate risk. Insurance in one form or another has been around as far back as there are records. What differed about insurance going into the 16th and 17th centuries was that these informal mechanisms became formalized.

Lloyd's of London came into being in 1688 in English coffee shops that catered to sailors, traders, and others involved in trade. Lloyd's coffeehouse published a newspaper, which gave news from various parts of the world, and helped the underwriters of the insurance at the coffeehouse to determine the risk. This innovation was one of many that allowed for the categorization of risk. Another innovation was the use of ship catalogs and classifications.

Other forms of insurance began to appear as well. After the Great Fire of London, Nicholas Barbon began to sell fire insurance in 1667.

Laws were changed to deal with insurance issues, such as l'Ordonnance de la Marine (by Colbert in 1681).

=== Economic theory ===
As the economy grew through the commercial revolution, so did attempts to understand and influence it. Economic theory as a separate subject of its own came into being as the stresses of the new global order brought about two opposing theories of how a nation accumulates wealth: mercantilistic and free-trade policies. Mercantilism inflamed the growing hostilities between the increasingly centralized European powers as the accumulation of precious metals by governments was seen as important to the prestige and power of a modern nation. This involvement in accumulating gold and silver (among other things) became important in the development of the nation-state. Governments' involvement in trade affected the nobility of western European nations, because increased wealth by non-nobles threatened the nobility's place in society.

=== Trade monopolies ===
Governments became involved in trade directly through the granting of royal trade monopolies. For example, Walter Raleigh had been granted a trade monopoly by Queen Elizabeth, for the export of broadcloth and wine. Ironically, competition between colonial powers led to their granting of trade monopolies to the East India Companies.

=== Triangular trade ===
A triangular trade occurred in this period: between Africa, North and South America, and Europe; and it worked in the following way: Slaves came from Africa, and went to the Americas; raw materials came from the Americas and went to Europe; from there, finished goods came from Europe and were sold back to the Americas at a much higher price.

Due the massive die-off of the indigenous people, the Americas had a local deficit of labor required for the extraction of resources (such as gold and silver) and farming. Europe was also recovering from the Black Plague and its resurgences, and population growth was slowed by intermittent warfare by European nations among themselves and against the Ottoman Empire. As a result of these limitations, the colonial powers were unable to satisfy the labor shortage through emigration, and the Atlantic Slave Trade was established to import the labor. This can be contrasted with the Qing dynasty's colonization of Inner Asia, whereby the high population in China proper produced policies that encouraged Han resettlement in Dzungaria during the 18th century, and Inner Mongolia and Manchuria during the 19th century.

== Law ==
Laws began to change to deal with commerce, both internationally, and locally within individual countries.

In France, for example, the Ordinance of Marine of Louis XIV was published under the auspices of Colbert in 1691, and was the first complete code of maritime and commercial law; and "when we consider the originality and extent of the design and the ability with which it is executed, we shall not hesitate to admit that it deserves to be ranked among the noblest works that legislative genius and learning have ever accomplished."

In England, the Navigation Acts were among the British effort to regulate trade.

== Effects ==
The commercial revolution, coupled with other changes in the early modern period, had dramatic effects on the globe.

For more than 2000 years the Mediterranean Sea had been the focus of European trade with other parts of the world. This focus shifted to the Atlantic Ocean by routes south around the Cape of Good Hope after 1488, and by trans-Atlantic trade after 1492. Older overland trade routes such as the Silk Road suffered economic decline due to the new maritime competition.

Christopher Columbus and the conquistadors, through their travels, were indirectly responsible for the massive depopulation of South America. They conquered the Inca, Aztec, and Maya peoples and incorporated their territories into the Spanish Empire. Other Europeans similarly affected the peoples of North America as well.

An equally important consequence of the commercial revolution was the Columbian Exchange. Plants and animals moved throughout the world due to human movements. For example, Yellow fever, previously unknown in North and South America, was imported through water that ships took on in Africa. Cocoa (chocolate), coffee, maize, cassava, and potatoes moved from one hemisphere to the other. Better food and more wealth allowed for larger families. The migration of peoples from Europe to the Americas allowed for European populations to increase. Higher caloric yields of the New World staple crops reduced the percentage of the workforce engaged in agricultural labor and accelerated urbanization.

Europe's commercial revolution also created a foundation of wealth needed for the Industrial Revolution. The expanding labor force was also redirected into nascent industrialization. Economic prosperity financed new forms of cultural expression during this period.

== See also ==
- List of largest European cities in history
- Mississippi Company
- Proto-globalization
- Putting-out system
- South Sea Company
- Treaty of Tordesillas
