= Public domain in French public law =

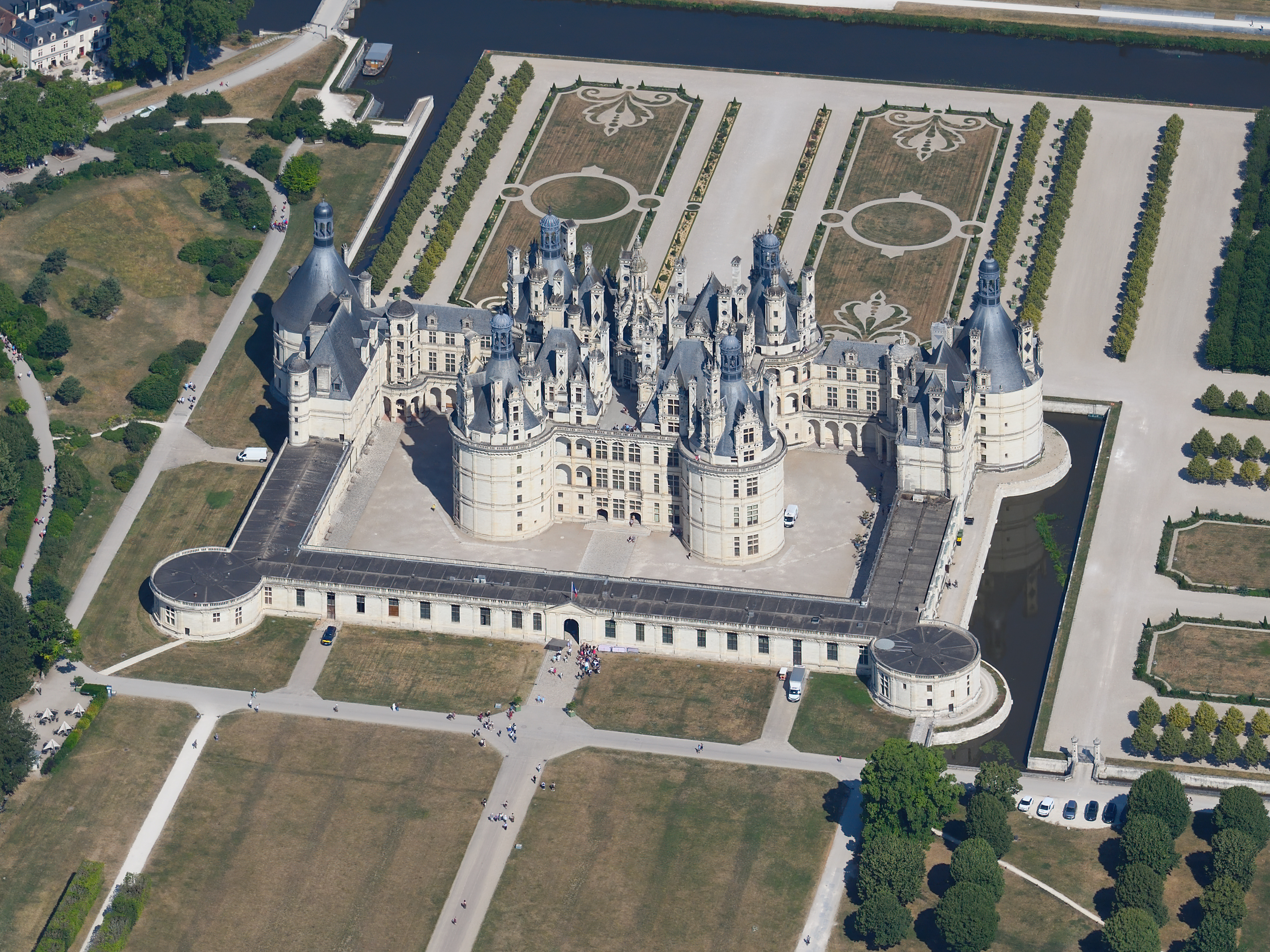
National palaces, like Chambord, are part of the artificial public domain.

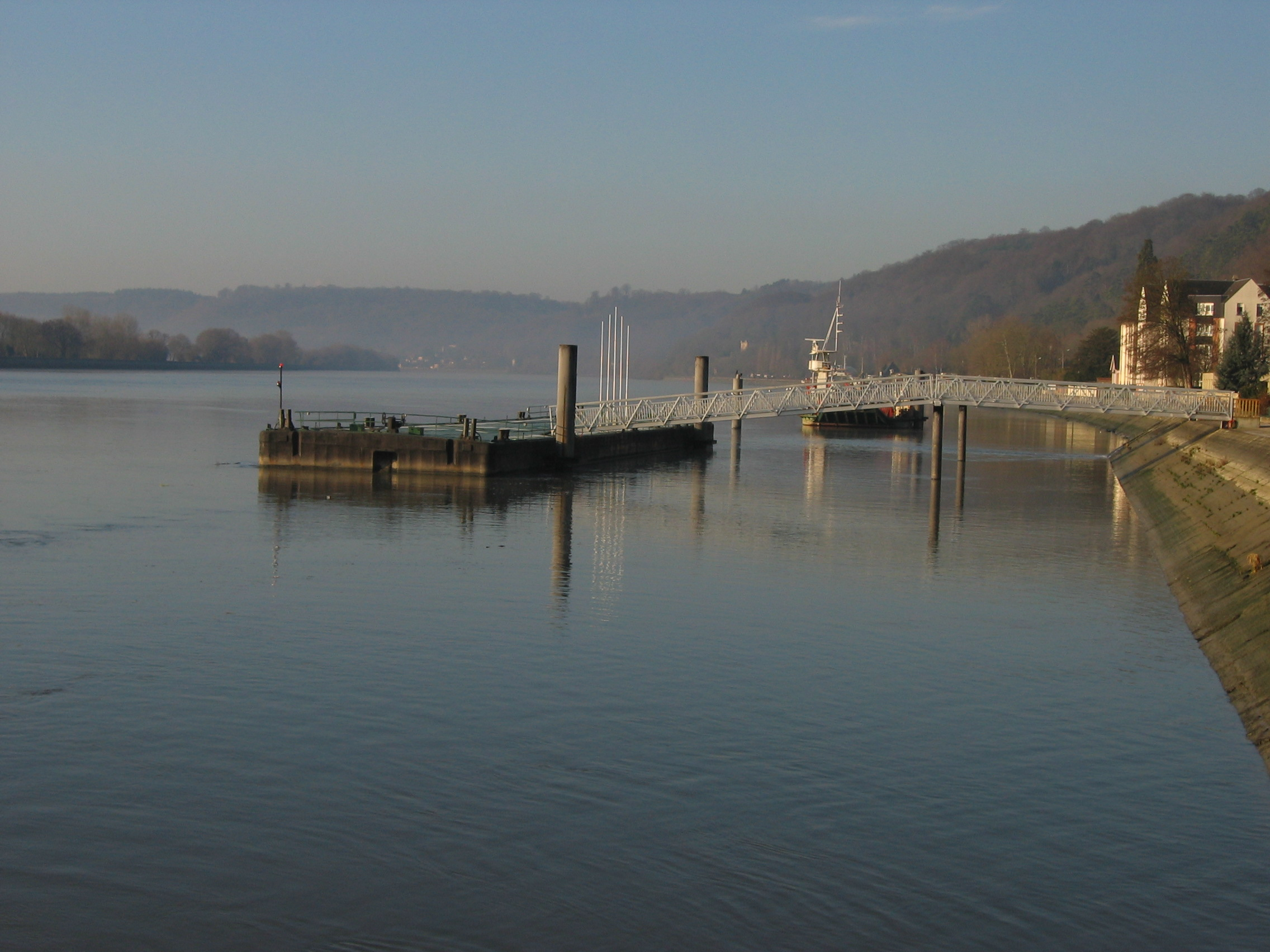
The Seine is part of the public river domain

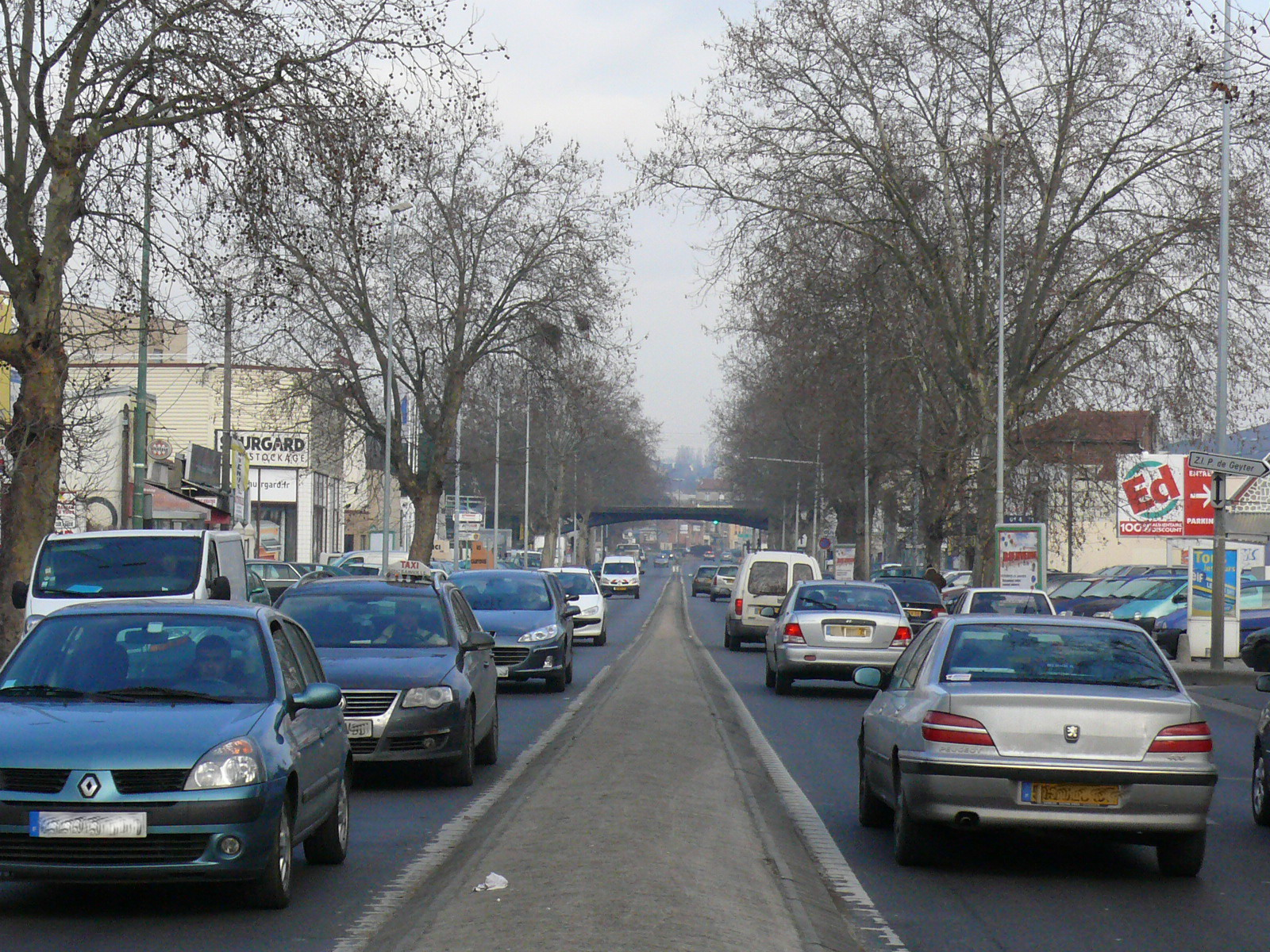
A road is part of the public road domain

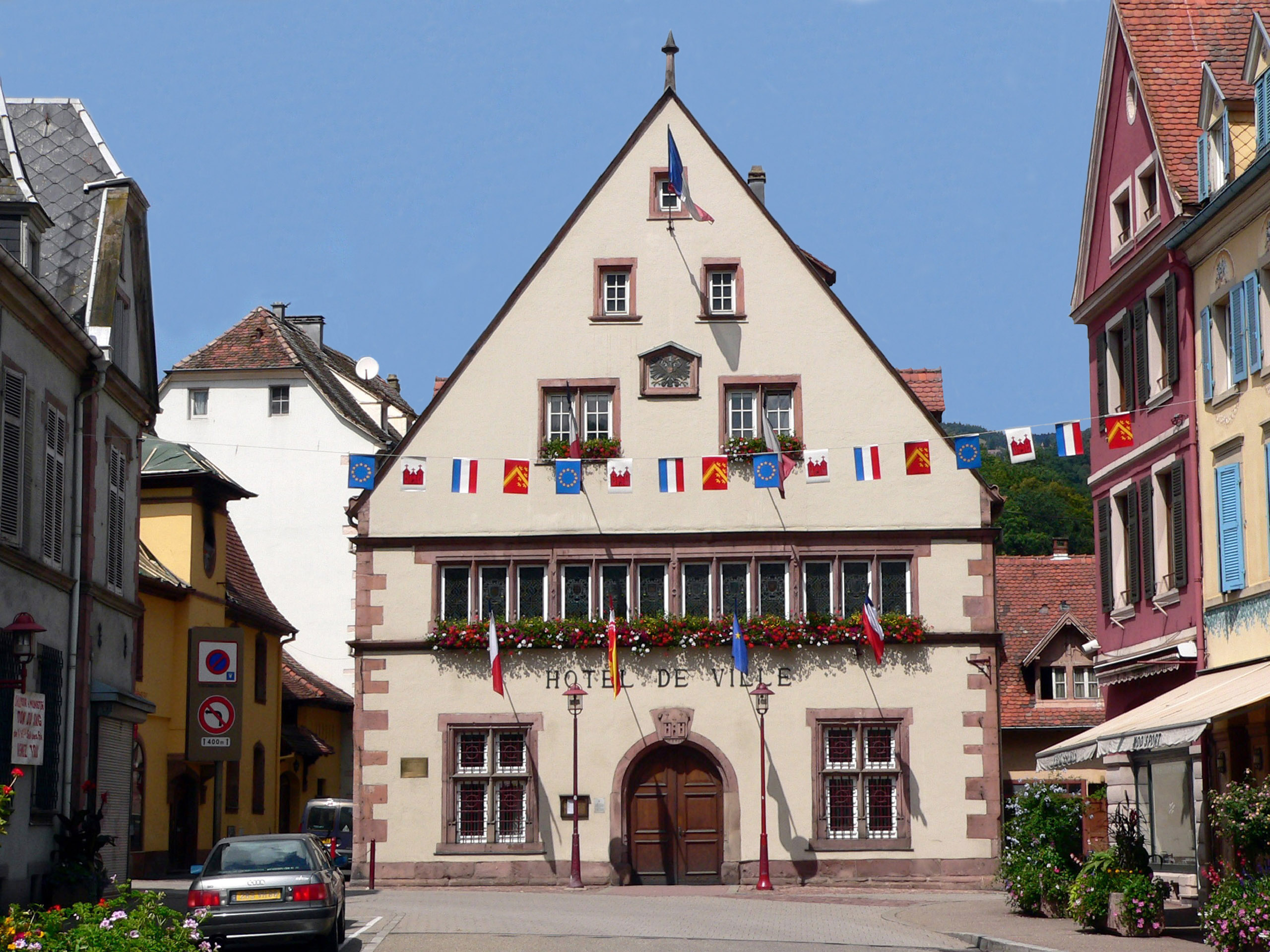
A town hall is part of the public domain...

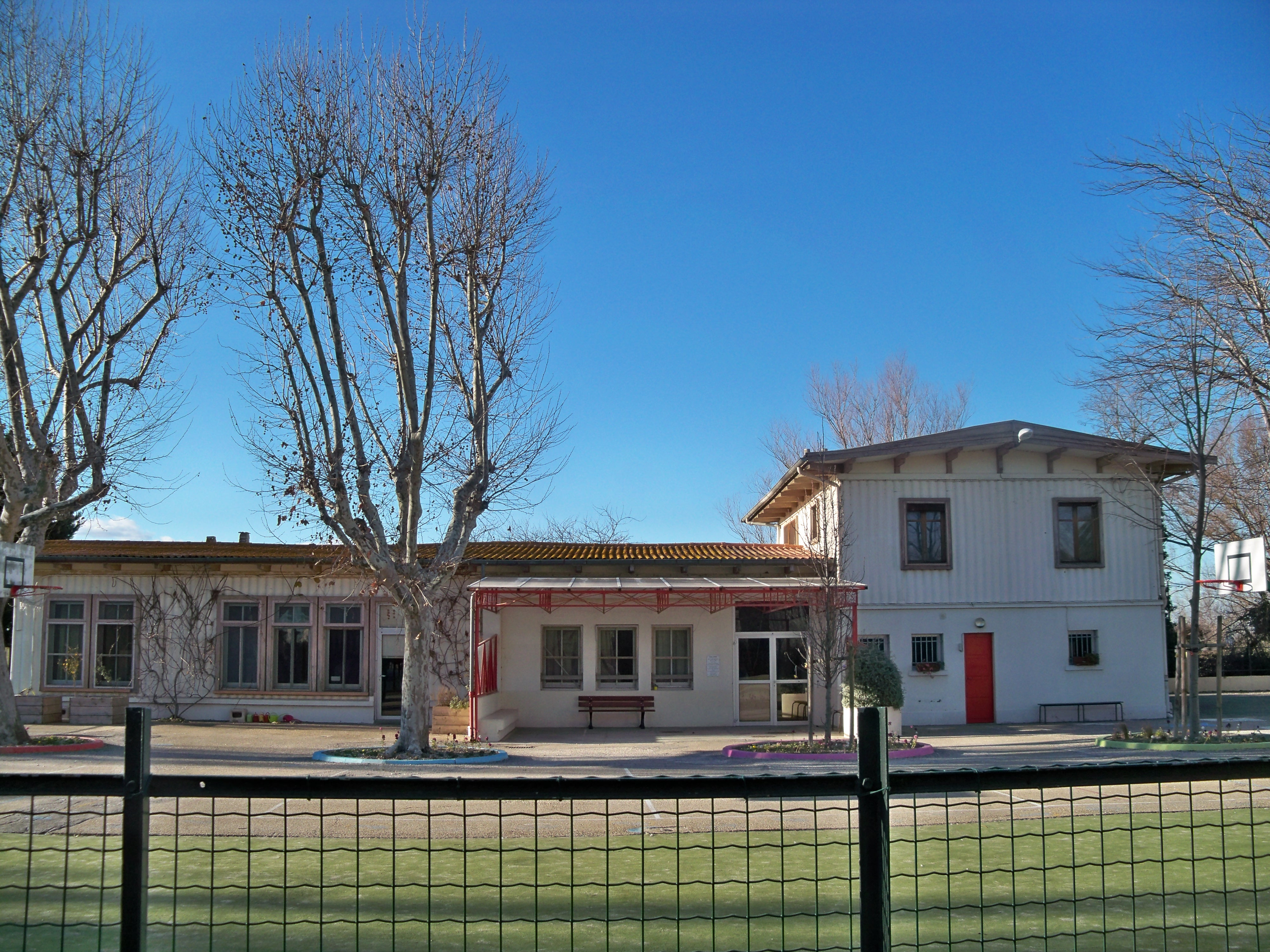
... and a school assigned to the public education service.

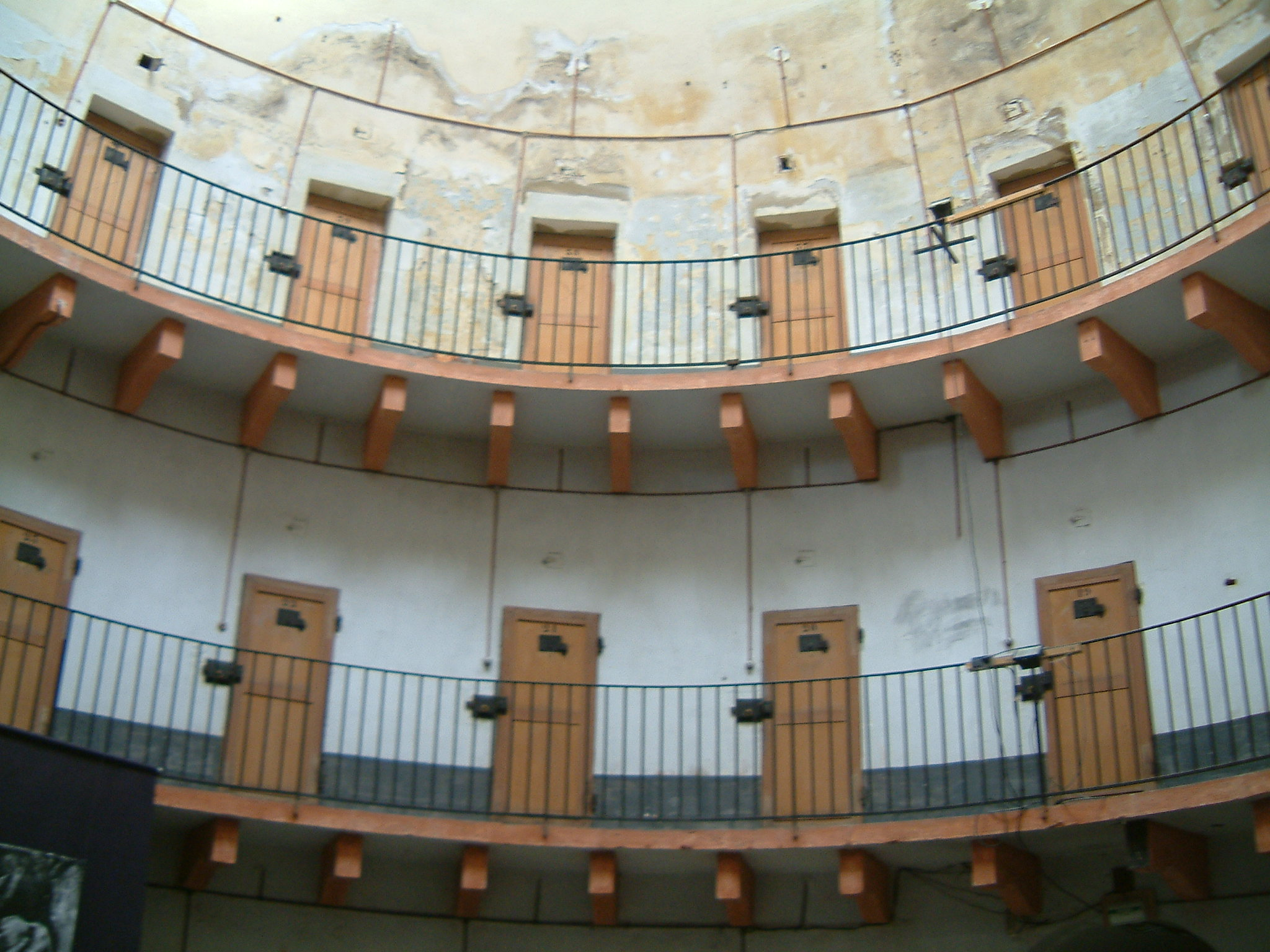
... or a prison, assigned to the public prison service

In French public law, the public domain is all property (immovable or movable) belonging to the state, local authorities, public establishments, or other public bodies, and assigned to a public purpose.

This public utility may result from the property being assigned for the direct use of the public (such as roads or public gardens) or for a public service, provided that, in the latter case, the property is subject to development that is essential to the performance of the tasks of that public service (such as a university or a court). Prior to 2006, case law applied the criterion of special development, and as such, property that had been classified as public domain property prior to this date did not lose this status, as the Conseil d'Etat ruled that the criterion of essential development was not retroactive.

The Direction de l'immobilier de l'État (DIE), created in 2016 to replace France Domaine (formerly Les Domaines), is a department of the Ministry of Finance responsible for administering the State's public domain assets, both movable and immovable, and monitoring the acquisition and disposal policies of local authorities and their public establishments.

== History ==
The concept of the public domain stems both from doctrinal proposals (such as the work of Proudhon) and from case law protecting its use during the nineteenth century.

The public domain is often confused with the notion of the unavailability of the Domaine royal or Domaine de la Couronne under the Ancien régime. Although, since the Edict of Moulins, property belonging to the Crown Estate was inalienable, this inalienability applied to all property, regardless of its use. It therefore has nothing in common with the public domain as we know it today, which protects property allocated to the public interest.

== Definition of public domain ==
=== Public real estate ===
According to article L. 2111-1 of the General Code of Public Property, the public domain of a public entity (the state, local authorities and their groupings, public establishments, or other public entities mentioned in article L. 2 of the General Code of Public Property) is made up, unless special legislative provisions apply, of immovable property that belongs to this public entity and:

- are assigned for the direct use of the public,
- are assigned to a public service. In the latter case, they must have been the subject of "development essential to the performance of the tasks of this public service".

Prior to the entry into force of the General Code on the Ownership of Public Property in 2006, the case law of the Conseil d'État, dated 19 October 1956, Le Béton, had specified that an asset was part of the public domain if it belonged to a public entity and had undergone "special" development with regard to the public service for which it was assigned.

For example, in the Dauphin ruling of 1959, the Conseil d'Etat ruled that a driveway had been incorporated into the public domain because:

- It belonged to the state, and that;
- on the one hand, the State had assigned it to a public service because of the presence of an archaeological site at that location; and
- on the other hand, the authorities had installed two posts and a chain to close off access to this pathway, which constituted a "special arrangement" carried out specifically with a view to assigning the pathway to this cultural public service.

The General Code on the Ownership of Public Property (CGPPP) has taken up this concept, but specifies that the development must be "essential" to the public service mission: the aim is to curb the trend in case law, which tended to extend the public domain too far. This new classification did not have the effect of downgrading property that had been allocated before the Code came into force.

The status of property belonging to the public domain may also result from a legal qualification. This is the case with radio waves, which the Act of 26 July 1996 placed in a "public domain of radio frequencies" by entrusting ARCEP with the task of allocating frequency bands.

=== Movable public domain ===
Article L. 2112-1 of the General Code on the Ownership of Public Property stipulates that movable property may belong to the public domain. In this case, the movable property must belong to a public entity and be of "public interest from the point of view of history, art, archaeology, science or technology". The same article sets out a non-exhaustive list of items meeting this requirement, such as:

- Museum collections;
- library collections of old, rare or precious documents;
- public collections belonging to the Mobilier national and the Manufacture nationale de Sèvres.

=== Private domain ===
Alongside their public domain, public bodies also have a private domain, which is subject to approximately the same legal rules as property belonging to a private individual.

Article L. 2211-1 of the CGPPP stipulates that property that does not meet the criteria for public property belongs in the private domain.

The law may also classify as private property assigned to a public service or used by the public. This is the case in particular for "land reserves and real estate used for offices, excluding those forming an indivisible whole with real estate belonging to the public domain", as well as rural roads and "woods and forests belonging to public bodies covered by the forestry regime".

== Delimitation of the public domain ==
A distinction can be made between elements of the public domain according to whether they are natural or artificial, and according to their geographical location.

=== The natural public domain ===
==== Public maritime domain ====
The public maritime domain was defined by Colbert's marine ordinance of 1681, until the ordinance of 21 April 2006 relating to the legislative part of the General Code of Public Property, which repealed this old provision in article 7. Colbert's decree specified that "the edge and shore of the sea shall be deemed to be all that it covers and uncovers during the new and full moons, and as far as the great flood of March can extend over the shores" (foreshore).

Until 1973, to set the limit of the public maritime domain on the Mediterranean coast, case law even referred to Roman law and to an ordinance issued by Justinian, which set the winter high water as the reference point, rather than the March high water. The Conseil d'Etat unified the rule by specifying that the public maritime domain extends "to the point where the highest seas can extend, in the absence of exceptional disturbances". It therefore makes no difference whether high water occurs in winter or March. This case law will be taken up by the new Code.

The clarification regarding the absence of exceptional disturbances makes it possible to avoid a sudden increase in the public domain during a storm or temporary flooding.

The law of 28 November 1963 extended this maritime public domain to the soil and subsoil of the territorial sea and to alluvial deposits ("lais et relais de la mer ").

In the French overseas departments, the public maritime domain also includes the area known as the "cinquante pas géométriques" along the limit of the highest tides. This was originally intended to reserve for the King of France a strip of land fifty paces (81.20 metres) long along the shore of the lands discovered in America, for military purposes.

==== River public domain ====
Articles L 2111-7 and L 2111-8 of the General Public Property Code (CGPPP) list navigable and/or floatable watercourses, frozen watercourses or lakes, banks covered by water and the waters of overseas departments.

The 1964 decree establishes the nomenclature of navigable and non-navigable watercourses.

The boundaries of watercourses are determined on the basis of the notion of bank (defined in article 558 of the Civil Code), extending to the notion of ditches (meadows in counterpart to regularly flooded banks) and boires (natural water reserves for animals).

For a lake with a spillway: the boundary is the banks above the spillway. When the lake does not have a spillway, the limit is established by the highest level reached outside of exceptional floods (Lake Geneva).

==== Public airspace ====
There is no such thing as an aerial public domain. The Conseil d'Etat (decision of 8 March 1993, Commune des Molières) has not established the idea of an aerial public domain.

==== Subsoil ====
Article 552 of the French Civil Code states that "ownership of the land entails ownership of the land below and above it ". This means that the owner may carry out any works he wishes under the ground, provided that they do not adversely affect the archaeological heritage, and provided that they do not involve the exploitation of materials covered by the Mining Code, for which the State alone may grant the right of exploitation.

However, the owner of the land may sell or be expropriated part of the subsoil of his property, for example to build a railway or road tunnel. This underground volume may be classified as an artificial public domain, if the conditions are met.

==== Public radio broadcasting ====
The law of 17 January 1989 established that radio waves (radio frequencies) constitute a means of private occupation of the public domain (invitation to tender for UMTS licences, for example).

Today, the existence of the public radio domain is affirmed by the legislator in the Code générale de la propriété des personnes publiques, 2111-17: "The radio frequencies available on the territory of the Republic come under the public domain of the State". Article L.2124-26 states that "the use, by licence holders, of radio frequencies available on the territory of the Republic constitutes a private occupation of the State's public domain".

=== Artificial public domain ===
The artificial public domain includes the assets of the artificial public domain assigned for direct use by the public, and certain assets assigned to public services.

The items assigned for direct use by the public include:

- the public road domain, consisting of "all public domain assets (Note: Rural roads form part of the municipality's private domain, as determined by law (article L. 161-1 of the Rural and Maritime Fishing Code).) of the State, départements and communes assigned to the needs of land traffic, with the exception of railways", which is governed by the Highway Code;
- certain assets belonging to local authorities, such as public washhouses, landscaped public promenades and religious buildings that existed before the 1905 Separation Act and whose ownership was assigned to the communes and the State by the Act of 17 April 1906 and the Decree of 4 July 1912.

Property belonging to a public entity and assigned to a public service also forms part of the artificial public domain, if it has been subject to:

- a special development necessary for the operation of the public service, for property incorporated into the public domain before the entry into force of the General Code of the Property of Public Persons,
- an improvement that is essential to the operation of the public service, in the case of property allocated since 1 April 2006,

for example:

- museums, schools, prisons, sewage systems, market halls and markets, abattoirs, cemeteries, etc.;
- assets that constitute the very object of the service (furniture contained in public buildings, etc.);
- defence works (fortifications, naval and air bases, etc.);
- SNCF Réseau structures and facilities;
- aerodromes used for public air traffic;
- the artificial public river domain, consisting of seaports and structures established in the interests of maritime navigation;
- ski slopes.

== Protection of the public domain ==
The legal status of the public domain is characterised in particular by its protection, i.e. by :

- inalienability, i.e. the impossibility for a public entity to transfer to a private entity property belonging to its public domain before declassifying it, which means transferring it to its private domain,
- unseizability and, in general, the impossibility of using private law enforcement procedures against public bodies);
- and, as a result of its inalienability, its imprescriptibility(i.e. the impossibility for third parties to acquire a right to this property by prescription, i.e. by prolonged possession as in ordinary law: the public authority or body that owns the property can claim it at any time, even if a person has been occupying the public domain for a very long time (in French private law, prescription takes effect after 30 years).

This is why, before being transferred to a private party, public domain property must first be declassified, which presupposes that the public utility purpose has been removed and that a formal decision has been taken by the authorities. In some cases, this may require the intervention of a law (see, for example, the law on the inalienability of the royal estate or the Maori heads affair, laws relating to the privatisation of EDF or France-Télécom-Orange), the intervention of a public enquiry (e.g. in relation to public roads) or the agreement of another authority or of the person to whom the property is assigned (e.g. the agreement of the person to whom a church or other religious building is assigned).

The private use of any element of the public domain by a person who is not the manager must be authorised in writing (Note: Considering, secondly, that as recalled by the Law of 12 April 2000 on the rights of citizens in their relations with administrations, a system of implicit decision of acceptance cannot be instituted when the protection of freedoms or the safeguarding of other principles of constitutional value preclude it; that by virtue of article 17 of the Declaration of the Rights of Man and of the Citizen, to which the Preamble of the Constitution refers, the protection of the public domain is a constitutional imperative; that the regulatory authority could not therefore lawfully introduce a system of tacit authorisation to occupy the public domain, which precludes, in particular, the specification, where applicable, of the siting and operating requirements necessary for public traffic and for the conservation of the road network. -Conseil d'État, 21 March 2003, no. 189191, SIPPEREC.) by the manager, and this occupation, which is normally granted for a consideration and on a precarious and revocable basis, must be compatible with the public domain use.

The public domain is also protected by rigorous penalties for damage to the public domain: the "contravention de voirie" for property in the public road domain, and the "contravention de grande voirie " for other property.

=== Consequences ===
Because it is used for a public purpose, the public domain cannot be expropriated, can only with difficulty be subject to easements, and can now be the subject of a business (Pinel law of 18 June 2014) but under certain very restrictive conditions; private occupation agreements or authorisations (for an individual or a private legal entity) are always precarious.

We are seeing major attempts to reconcile the traditional desire to protect the public domain by virtue of its use, on the one hand, and the desire to enhance its economic value, on the other. This has even led some to question the usefulness of retaining the principle of the inalienability of the public domain [ref. needed]. These questions are the result of different approaches to the concept of the public domain: once an area to be protected against royal squandering, today it is seen as a resource to be exploited.

However, the taxation of immovable property in the public domain is not exorbitant on this point, insofar as, by virtue of the principle of tax neutrality, it is taxed according to the same rules as those applicable to private individuals.

== Leaving the public domain ==
=== Conditions for leaving the public domain ===
An asset owned by a public entity referred to in article L. 1, which is no longer used for a public service or for the direct use of the public, is no longer part of the public domain from the date of the administrative act declaring its decommissioning

— Article L. 2141-1 of the Code général de la propriété des personnes publiques.

==== Decommissioning (Disuse) ====
As public property is property belonging to a public entity and used directly by the public, or used for a public service and equipped with essential facilities (since CGPPP 2006), before a decision can be taken to declassify public property, it must be removed from this use. The authority that manages the public domain asset must establish that it has in fact been decommissioned.

==== Downgrading (Reclassification) ====
In contrast to "désaffectation," or disuse which refers to a factual situation, "déclassement" or reclassificaiton, implies an explicit decision by the authority responsible for public property. (minister, prefect, decision-making body of a public institution or local authority, etc.) by decree, order or decision, following a formal procedure which, in some cases, includes a public enquiry or the need to obtain the agreement of a third party authority.

Property decommissioned from the public domain becomes part of the private domain of the public entity that owns it, which may then give it a new purpose, keep it as a land reserve, manage it as private property or finally decide to sell it under the conditions of civil law, subject, where applicable, to compliance with certain rules designed to protect the interests of the State and its public policies.

=== Legal situation if not decommissioned ===
When an asset in the public domain is decommissioned without having been disused, or when it is once again used directly by the public or for a public service for which it has been specially equipped, the asset remains or is classified in the public domain.

==== Inalienability of property not decommissioned ====
The property of the public bodies referred to in Article L. 1, which comes under the public domain, is inalienable and imprescriptible

— Article L.3111-1 of the Code général de la propriété des personnes publiques on Légifrance.

They are also exempt from seizure, meaning that a creditor cannot seize property to obtain payment of his debt. However, creditors do have other means of obtaining payment of their debt, such as having the prefect automatically authorise payment of the amount of a debt owed by a local authority. Consequently, public property cannot be used as collateral.

These provisions are intended to ensure the regular operation of the public service to which the asset is assigned, or the maintenance of its direct use by the public.

==== Deferred decommissioning ====
(...) a building belonging to the artificial public domain of the State or its public establishments and used for a public service may be decommissioned as soon as it has been decommissioned, even if the requirements of the public service justify the decommissioning taking effect only within a period set by the decommissioning act. This period may not exceed a period set by decree. This period may not exceed three years. In the event of the sale of this property, the deed of sale shall stipulate that it will be cancelled ipso jure if it is not decommissioned within this period.

— Article L. 2141-2 of the French General Code of Public Property

These provisions do not apply to the property of local authorities and their public establishments. However, a reform will be submitted to Parliament in 2016 to give them the option of deferred decommissioning.

== See also ==
=== Bibliography ===
1. Ministère de L'économie des Finances et de La Souveraineté Industrielle et Numérique (n.d.). "Nouvelle politique immobilière de l'Etat".
2. Conseil d'Etat (1956), Conseil d'Etat, Section, du 19 octobre 1956, 20180, publié au recueil Lebon
3. Conseil d’Etat (1959). "Conseil d'Etat, Assemblée, 11 mai 1959, Dauphin, rec. p. 294". Revue générale du droit.
4. Conseil d'État (2012), Conseil d'État, 8ème et 3ème sous-sections réunies, 07/05/2012, 342107, Publié au recueil Lebon
5. Ministère de L'économie des Finances et de La Souveraineté Industrielle et Numérique (1996), LOI n°96-659 du 26 juillet 1996 de réglementation des télécommunications
6. Ministère de L'économie des Finances et de La Souveraineté Industrielle et Numérique (2006a). "Article L2211-1 – Code général de la propriété des personnes publiques – Légifrance". www.legifrance.gouv.fr.
7. Ministère de L'économie des Finances et de La Souveraineté Industrielle et Numérique (2006b). "article L. 2212-1 du Code général de la propriété des personnes publiques".
8. Ordonnance de la Marine du mois. Bibliothèque nationale de France. 1681.
9. Conseil d'Etat (1973), Conseil d'Etat, Assemblée, du 12 octobre 1973, 86682 88545 89200, publié au recueil Lebon
10. Légifrance (n.d.). "Article 552 – Code civil – Légifrance". www.legifrance.gouv.fr.
11. Yolka, Philippe (2006). "Identifier le domaine public". Revue juridique de l'entreprise publique. 636.
12. Terrot (2010). "Question écrite de Michel Terrot n°74002". questions.assemblee-nationale.fr.
13. Bardin, Michaël (2013). "L'aménagement indispensable et la modernisation de la domanialité publique". La Semaine Juridique, édition administrations et collectivités territoriales n°2013.2071. 24.
14. Légifrance (1992). "Article l. 161-1 du code rural et de la pêche maritime".
15. Légifrance (2015a). "Article L111-1 – Code de la voirie routière – Légifrance". www.legifrance.gouv.fr.
16. Légifrance (1956). "Conseil d'Etat, Section, du 19 octobre 1956, 20180, publié au recueil Lebon".
17. Légifrance (2015b), Cour Administrative d'Appel de Marseille, 6ème chambre – formation à 5, 12/03/2015, 14MA03803, Inédit au recueil Lebon
18. Légifrance (2014). "Conseil d'État, Section du Contentieux, 28/04/2014, 349420, Publié au recueil Lebon".
19. Eveillard, Gweltaz (2014). "Les pistes de ski font partie du domaine public". Droit Administratif, Nos 8-9/2014. 50.
20. Légifrance (2006a). "Article L3111-1 – Code général de la propriété des personnes publiques – Légifrance". www.legifrance.gouv.fr.
21. Légifrance (2006b). "Article L2311-1 – Code général de la propriété des personnes publiques – Légifrance". www.legifrance.gouv.fr.
22. Légifrance (2016). "Article L141-3 – Code de la voirie routière – Légifrance". www.legifrance.gouv.fr.
23. Légifrance (2024). "Décret n° 70–220 du 17 mars 1970 portant déconcentration en matière de désaffectation des édifices cultuels".
24. Légifrance (2006c). "Article L2122-4 – Code général de la propriété des personnes publiques – Légifrance". www.legifrance.gouv.fr.
25. Légifrance (2017a). "Article L2122-1 – Code général de la propriété des personnes publiques – Légifrance". www.legifrance.gouv.fr.
26. Jurisclasseur public (2002). "Fasc. 20 : CONTRAVENTIONS DE VOIRIE ROUTIÈRE" [Fasc. 20: ROADS CONTRAVENTIONS]. LexisNexis (in French). Archived from the original on 2016-03-03.
27. Légifrance (2006d). "Article L2132-2 – Code général de la propriété des personnes publiques – Légifrance". www.legifrance.gouv.fr.
28. Sauvé, Jean-Marc (2011). "La valorisation économique des propriétés des personnes publiques".
29. Légifrance (2006e). "Article L2141-1 – Code général de la propriété des personnes publiques – Légifrance". www.legifrance.gouv.fr.
30. Préfecture de la Creuse (n.d.). "Guide des procédures de classement / déclassement des voies communale" (PDF).
31. Coulot, Jean-Michel (2010). "Désaffectation des édifices du culte et du mobilier les garnissan" (PDF). Évêché d’Évry. Archived from the original (PDF) on 2016-03-03.
32. Légifrance (2006f). "Article L2221-1 – Code général de la propriété des personnes publiques – Légifrance". www.legifrance.gouv.fr.
33. Légifrance (2006g). "Article L.3111-1 du Code général de la propriété des personnes publiques sur Légifrance".
34. Légifrance (2006h). "Article L. 2311-1 du Code général de la propriété des personnes publiques".
35. Légifrance (2015c). "Article L. 1612–16 du Code général des collectivités territoriales".
36. Légifrance (2017b). "Article L2141-2 – Code général de la propriété des personnes publiques – Légifrance". www.legifrance.gouv.fr.
37. Sénat (2015). "Mécanisme de déclassement anticipé". Sénat (in French).

=== Related articles ===
- Uruguay Round Agreements Act
- Public law• Administrative law• Public interest
- Administrative law in France
- Right to property• Private property• Public property
- National forest (France)
- Emphyteusis

=== External links ===
- Public domain (fr) on JurisPedia
- Public maritime domain (Ministry of Public Works)
- Les critères de la domanialité publique immobilière on Territorial.fr
- Y. Goutal, S. Banel, I. Wursthorn and E-L. Bernardi, "La valorisation du patrimoine public", Lamy, 2013
- Groupe Monassier – réseau notarial, De la domanialité publique à la propriété publique , 25 June 2014
