= Right to property =

Human right to own property

The right to property, or the right to own property (cf. ownership), is often classified as a human right for natural persons regarding their private property. The Fourth Amendment to the United States Constitution is credited as a significant precedent for the legal protection of individual property rights.

A right to property is specified in Article 17 of the 1948 Universal Declaration of Human Rights, but it is not recognised in the 1966 International Covenant on Civil and Political Rights or in the 1966 International Covenant on Economic, Social and Cultural Rights. The 1950 European Convention on Human Rights acknowledges a right for a natural or legal person to "peaceful enjoyment of his possessions", subject to the "general interest or to secure the payment of taxes."

== Definition ==
Article 17 of the Universal Declaration of Human Rights (UDHR) enshrines the right to property as follows:

(1) Everyone has the right to own property alone as well as in association with others. (2) No one shall be arbitrarily deprived of his or her property.

The object of the right to property as it is usually understood nowadays consists of property already owned or possessed, or of property acquired or to be acquired by a person through lawful means. Not in opposition but in contrast to this, some proposals also defend a universal right to private property, in the sense of a right of every person to effectively receive a certain amount of property, grounded in a claim to Earth's natural resources or other theories of justice.

The right to property is one of the most controversial human rights, both in terms of its existence and interpretation. The controversy about the definition of the right meant that it was not included in the International Covenant on Civil and Political Rights or the International Covenant on Economic, Social and Cultural Rights. Controversy centres upon who is deemed to have property rights protected (e.g. human beings or also corporations), the type of property which is protected (property used for the purpose of consumption or production) and the reasons for which property can be restricted (for instance, for regulations, taxation or nationalisation in the public interest). In all human rights instruments, either implicit or express restrictions exist on the extent to which property is protected.

=== Africa ===
The African Charter on Human and Peoples' Rights (ACHPR) protects the right to property most explicitly in Article 14, stating:

The right to property shall be guaranteed. It may only be encroached upon in the interest of public need or in the general interest of the community and in accordance with the provisions of appropriate laws.

Property rights are furthermore recognised in Article 13 of the ACHPR, which states that every citizen has the right to participate freely in the government of his country, the right to equal access to public services and "the right of access to public property and services in strict equality of all persons before the law". Article 21 of the ACHPR recognises the right of all peoples to freely dispose of their wealth and natural resources and that this right shall be exercised in the exclusive interest of the people, who may not be deprived of this right. Article 21 also provides that "in case of spoliation the dispossessed people shall have the right to the lawful recovery of its property as well as to adequate compensation".

=== Americas ===
When the text of the UDHR was negotiated, other states in the Americas argued that the right to property should be limited to the protection of private property necessary for subsistence. Their suggestion was opposed, but was enshrined in the American Declaration of the Rights and Duties of Man, which was negotiated at the same time and adopted one year before the UDHR in 1948. Article 23 of the declaration states:

Every Person has the right to own such private property as meets the essential needs of decent living and helps to maintain the dignity of the individual and of the home.

The definition of the right to property is heavily influenced by Western concepts of property rights, but because property rights vary considerably in different legal systems it has not been possible to establish international standards on property rights. The regional human rights instruments of Europe, Africa and the Americas recognise the right to protection of property to varying degrees.

The American Convention on Human Rights (ACHR) recognises the right to protection of property, including the right to "just compensation". The ACHR also prohibits usury and other exploitation, which is unique amongst human rights instruments. Article 21 of the ACHR states:

(1) Everyone has the right to the use and enjoyment of his property. The law may subordinate such use and enjoyment to the interest of society.

(2) No one shall be deprived of his property except upon payment of just compensation, for reasons of public utility or social interest, and in the cases and according to the forms established by law.

(3) Usury and any other form of exploitation of man by man shall be prohibited by law.

=== Europe ===
After failed attempts to include the right to protection of property in the European Convention on Human Rights (ECHR), European states enshrined the right to protection of property in Article 1 of Protocol I to the ECHR as the "right to peaceful enjoyment of possessions", where the right to protection of property is defined as such:

(1) Every natural or legal person is entitled to the peaceful enjoyment of his possessions. No one shall be deprived of his possessions except in the public interest and subject to the conditions provided for by law and by the general principles of international law. (2) The preceding provisions shall not, however, in any way impair the right of a State to enforce such laws as it deems necessary to control the use of property in accordance with the general interest or to secure the payment of taxes or other contributions or penalties.

Therefore, European human rights law recognises the right to peaceful enjoyment of property, makes deprivation of possessions subject to certain conditions and recognises that states can balance the right to peaceful possession of property against the public interest. The European Court of Human Rights has interpreted "possessions" to include not only tangible property, but also economic interests, contractual agreements with economic value, compensation claims against the state and public law related claims such as pensions. The European Court of Human Rights has held that the right to property is not absolute and states have a wide degree of discretion to limit the rights. As such, the right to property is regarded as a more flexible right than other human rights. States' degree of discretion is defined in Handyside v. United Kingdom, heard by the European Court of Human Rights in 1976. Notable cases where the European Court of Human Rights has found the right to property having been violated include Sporrong and Lonnroth v. Sweden, heard in 1982, where Swedish law kept property under the threat of expropriation for an extended period of time. The highest economic compensation following a judgment of the Strasbourg Court on this matter was given (1,3 million euro) in case Beyeler v. Italy.

=== India ===
In India property rights (Article 31) was one of the fundamental rights of citizens until 1978, and it became a legal right through the 44th Amendment to the Constitution in 1978. The amendment was introduced by the Morarji Desai government as part of land reform policies. In 2020, the Supreme Court of India has stated that, even though property rights are not part of a citizen's fundamental right, it should be considered as one of the human rights promised by the Constitution. The Supreme Court also ruled that the states cannot acquire individual land unless there is a clear legal framework.

=== International conventions ===
Property rights are also recognised in the International Convention on the Elimination of All Forms of Racial Discrimination which states in Article 5 that everyone has the right to equality before the law without distinction as to race, colour and national or ethnic origin, including the "right to own property alone as well as in association with others" and "the right to inherit". The Convention on the Elimination of All Forms of Discrimination against Women recognises the property rights in Article 16, which establishes the same right for both spouses to ownership, acquisition, management, administration, enjoyment and disposition of property and Article 15, which establishes women's right to conclude contracts.

Property rights are also enshrined in the Convention Relating to the Status of Refugees and the Convention on the Protection of the Rights of All Migrant Workers and Members of Their Families. These international human rights instruments for minorities do not establish a separate right to property, but prohibit discrimination in relation to property rights where such rights are guaranteed.

== Relationship to other rights ==
The right to private property was a crucial demand in early quests for political freedom and equality and against feudal control of property. Property can serve as the basis for the entitlements that ensure the realisation of the right to an adequate standard of living and it was only property owners which were initially granted civil and political rights, such as the right to vote. Because not everybody is a property owner, the right to work was enshrined to allow everybody to attain an adequate standard of living. Today, discrimination on the basis of property ownership is commonly seen as a serious threat to the equal enjoyment of human rights by all and non-discrimination clauses in international human rights instruments frequently include property as a ground on the basis of which discrimination is prohibited (see the right to equality before the law). The protection of private property may come into conflict with economic, social and cultural rights and civil and political rights, such as the right to freedom of expression. To mitigate this, the right to property is commonly limited to protect the public interest. Many states also maintain systems of communal and collective ownership. Property rights have frequently been regarded as preventing the realisation of human rights for all, through for example slavery and the exploitation of others. Unequal distribution of wealth often follows line of sex, race and minorities, therefore property rights may appear to be part of the problem, rather than as an interest that merits protection. Property rights have been at the centre of recent human rights debates on land reform, the return of cultural artifacts by collectors and museums to indigenous peoples and the popular sovereignty of peoples over natural resources.

== History ==
The Roman law defined property as "the right to use and abuse one's own within the limits of the law" — jus utendi et abutendi re suâ, guatenus juris ratio patitur. Second, salus populi suprema lex esto, or "the safety of the people shall be the supreme law," was stipulated as early as the Law of the Twelve Tables. The notion of private property and property rights was elaborated further in the Renaissance as international trade by merchants gave rise to mercantilist ideas. In 16th-century Europe, Lutheranism and the Protestant Reformation advanced property rights using biblical terminology. The Protestant work ethic and views on man's destiny came to underline social views in emerging capitalist economies in early modern Europe. The right to private property emerged as a radical demand for human rights vis-a-vis the state in 17th-century revolutionary Europe, but in the 18th and 19th centuries the right to property as a human right became subject of intense controversy.

=== English Civil War ===
The arguments advanced by the Levellers during the English Civil War on property and civil and political rights, such as the right to vote, informed subsequent debates in other countries. The Levellers emerged as a political movement in mid-17th century England in the aftermath of the Protestant Reformation. They believed that property which had been earned as the fruit of one's labour was sacred under the Bible's commandment "thou shall not steal". As such, they believed that the right to acquire property from one's work was sacred. Levellers' views on the right to property and the right not to be deprived of property as a civil and political right were developed by the pamphleteer Richard Overton. In "An Arrow against all Tyrants" (1646), Overton argued:

To every individual in nature is given an individual property by nature not to be invaded or usurped by any. For everyone, as he is himself, so he has a self propertiety, else he could not be himself; and of this no second may presume to deprive of without manifest violation and affront to the very principles of nature of the rules of equity and justice between man and man. Mine and thine cannot be, except this. No man has power over my rights and liberties, and I over no man.

The views of the Levellers, who enjoyed support amongst small-scale property-owners and craftsmen, were not shared by all revolutionary parties of the English Civil War. At the 1647 General Council, Oliver Cromwell and Henry Ireton argued against equating the right to life with the right to property. They argued that doing so would establish the right to take anything that one may want, irrespective of the rights of others. The Leveller Thomas Rainsborough responded, relying on Overton's arguments, that the Levellers required respect for others' natural rights. The definition of property and whether it was acquired as the fruit of one's labour and as such a natural right was subject to intense debate because the right to vote depended on property ownership. Political freedom was at the time associated with property ownership and individual independence. Cromwell and Ireton maintained that only property in freehold land or chartered trading rights gave a man the right to vote. They argued that this type of property ownership constituted a "stake in society", which entitles men to political power. In contrast, Levellers argued that all men who are not servants, alms-recipients or beggars should be considered as property owners and be given voting rights. They believed that political freedom could only be secured by individuals, such as craftsmen, engaging in independent economic activity.

Levellers were primarily concerned with the civil and political rights of small-scale property owners and workers, whereas the Diggers, a smaller revolutionary group led by Gerrard Winstanley, focused on the rights of the rural poor who worked on landed property. The Diggers argued that private property was not consistent with justice and that the land that had been confiscated from the Crown and Church should be turned into communal land to be cultivated by the poor. According to the Diggers, the right to vote should be extended to all and everybody had the right to an adequate standard of living. With the Restoration of the English monarchy in 1660, all confiscated land returned to the Crown and Church. Some property rights were recognised and limited voting rights were established. The ideas of the Levellers on property and civil and political rights remained influential and were advanced in the subsequent 1688 Glorious Revolution, but restrictions on the right to vote based on property meant that only a fraction of the British population had the suffrage. In 1780 only 214,000 property-owning men were entitled to vote in England and Wales, less than 3 percent of the population of 8 million. The Reform Act 1832 restricted the right to vote to men who owned property with an annual value of £10, giving approximately 4 percent of the adult male population the right to vote. The reforms of 1867 extended the right to vote to approximately 8 percent. The working class (which increased dramatically with the Industrial Revolution) and industrialists remained effectively excluded from the political system.

=== John Locke and the American and French revolutions ===
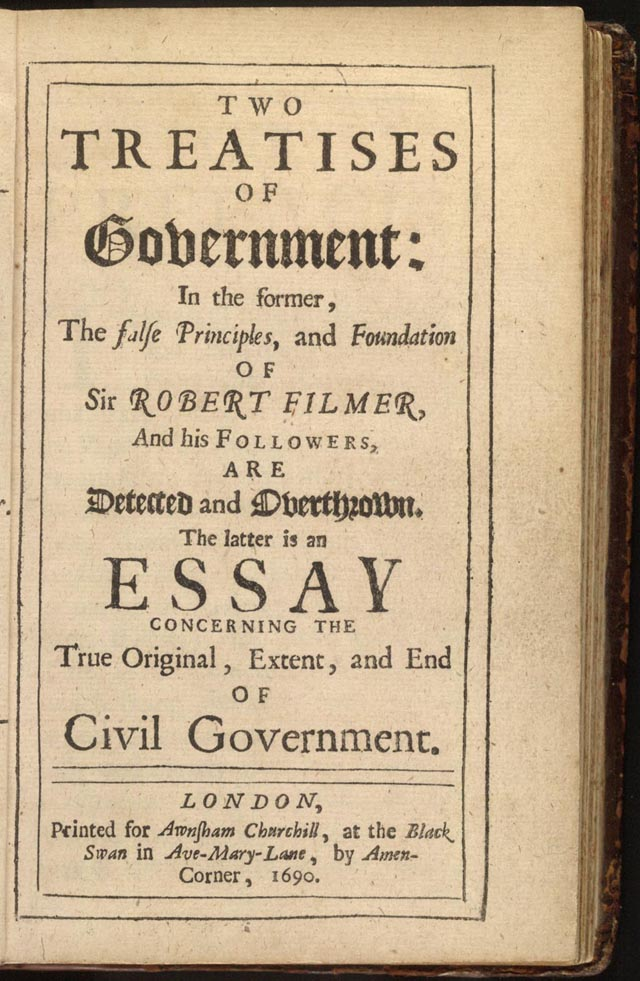
John Locke's 1689 Two Treatises of Government in which Locke calls "lives, liberties and estates" the "property" of individuals

The English philosopher John Locke (1632–1704) developed the ideas of property, civil and political rights further. In his Second Treatise on Civil Government (1689), Locke proclaimed that "everyman has a property in his person; this nobody has a right to but himself. The labor of his body and the work of his hand, we may say, are properly his". He argued that property ownership derives from one's labor, though those who do not own property and only have their labor to sell should not be given the same political power as those who owned property. Labourers, small-scale property owners and large-scale property owners should have civil and political rights in proportion to the property they owned. According to Locke, the right to property and the right to life were inalienable rights and that it was the duty of the state to secure these rights for individuals. Locke argued that the safeguarding of natural rights, such as the right to property, along with the separation of powers and other checks and balances, would help to curtail political abuses by the state.

Locke's labor theory of property and the separation of powers greatly influenced the American Revolution and the French Revolution. The entitlement to civil and political rights, such as the right to vote, was tied to the question of property in both revolutions. American revolutionaries, such as Benjamin Franklin and Thomas Jefferson, opposed universal suffrage, advocating votes only for those who owned a "stake" in society. James Madison argued that extending the right to vote to all could lead in the right to property and justice being "overruled by a majority without property". While it was initially suggested to establish the right to vote for all men, eventually the right to vote in the nascent United States was extended to white men who owned a specified amount of real estate and personal property.

French revolutionaries recognised property rights in Article 17 of the Declaration of the Rights of Man and of the Citizen (1791), which stated that no one "may be deprived of property rights unless a legally established public necessity required it and upon condition of a just and previous indemnity". Articles 3 and 6 declared that "all citizens have the right to contribute personally or through their representatives" in the political system and that "all citizens being equal before [the law], are equally admissible to all public offices, positions and employment according to their capacity, and without other distinction than that of virtues and talents". However, in practice the French revolutionaries did not extend civil and political rights to all, although the property qualification required for such rights was lower than that established by the American revolutionaries.

According to the French revolutionary Abbé Sieyès, "all the inhabitants of a country should enjoy the right of a passive citizen... but those alone who contribute to the public establishment are like the true shareholders in the great social enterprise. They alone are the true active citizens, the true members of the association". Three months after the Declaration had been adopted, domestic servants, women and those who did not pay taxes equal to three days of labor were declared "passive citizens". Sieyes wanted to see the rapid expansion of commercial activities and favoured the unrestricted accumulation of property. In contrast, Maximilien Robespierre warned that the free accumulation of wealth ought to be limited and that the right to property should not be permitted to violate the rights of others, particularly poorer citizens, including the working poor and peasants. Robespierre's views were eventually excluded from the French Constitution of 1793 and a property qualification for civil and political rights was maintained.

== See also ==
- Fifth Amendment to the United States Constitution § Takings Clause
- English land law
- Entitlement theory
- Married Women's Property Act 1882
- Property law
- Property rights (economics)
- Real estate business
- Real estate development
- Real estate bubble
- Right to housing
- Public domain in French public law
