= Public property =

Subset of state property for use of the public

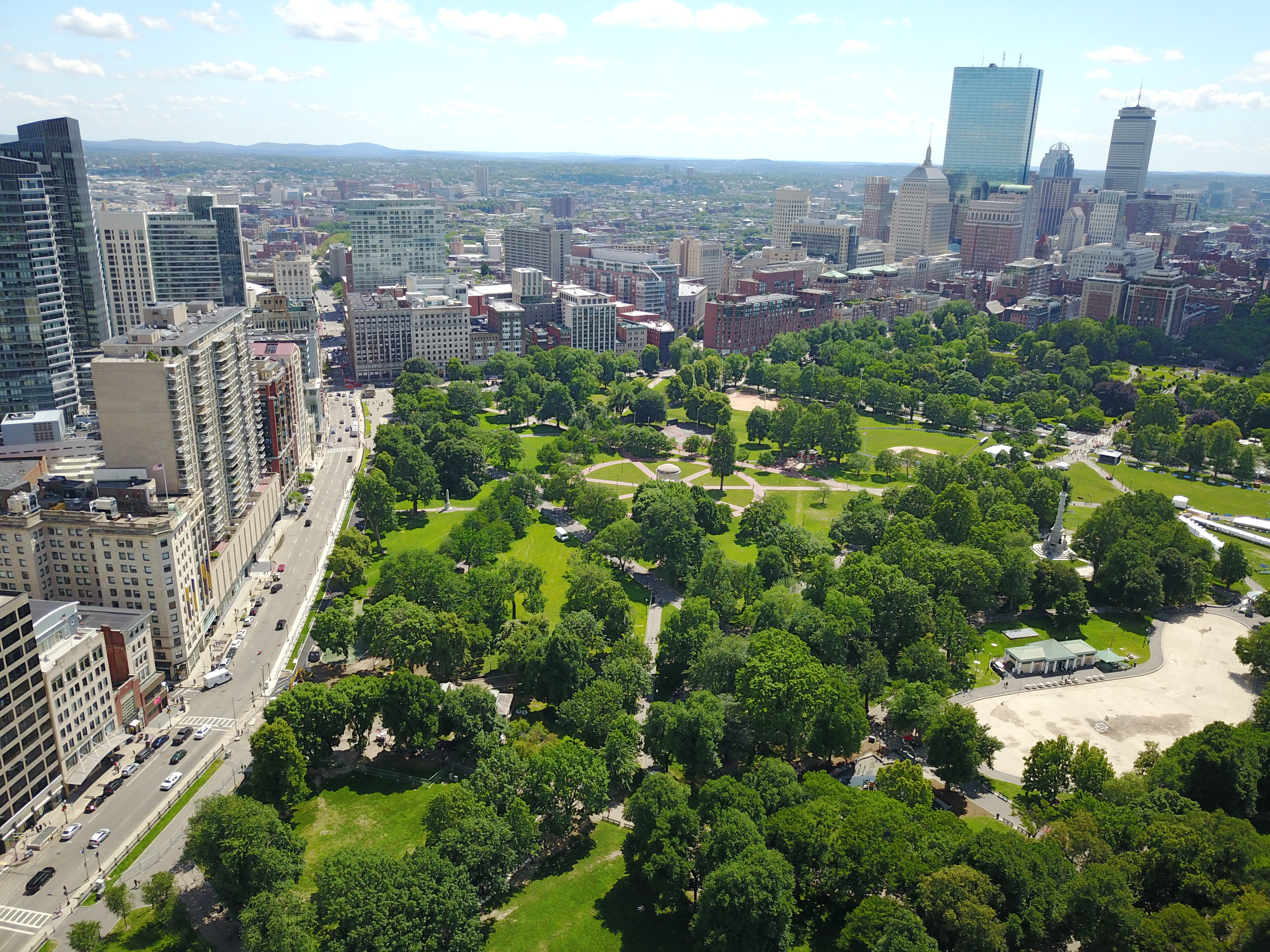
Public streets and parks like Tremont Street (left) and Boston Common are considered public properties.

Public property is property that is dedicated to public use. The term may be used either to describe the use to which the property is put, or to describe the character of its ownership (owned collectively by the population of a state). State ownership, also called public ownership, government ownership or state property, are property interests that are vested in the state, rather than an individual or communities.

== Differences from private property ==
American economist Armen A. Alchian explored what distinguishes public property from private property, concluding that a unique difference lies in the limitations put on its alienability. That is, a crucial feature of public property lies in the inability of their owners to sell or grant them to others. According to Alchian, private property is that which can be transferred at the discretion of its owners, whilst public property is that which cannot.

Consequently, because of the absence of exchange in much of what is public property and thereby the absence of market prices reflecting its value, it is difficult for a government to appraise its holdings. This can lead to problems with economic calculation.

Both rights with respect to public and private property are in part determined by governments. The owner of a private property can control it at own discretion, whilst the state reserves the right to charge taxes and nationalize it, or temporarily use it. The difference between public and private property lies in their alienability.

Most public property is government-provided and not charged for separately to users, but open to the public. However, it is incorrect to say that all public property can be used freely by the public. Many public goods are provided only to subsets of the population, such as care for the elderly and playgrounds for children. That is, the 'public' may vary and does not in fact determine its public or private nature.

== In Marxism ==
Karl Marx described private property as a fundamental social relation of bourgeois society, where it is used for appropriation of labor by capitalists. Marx considered that public property will replace the private property, as a natural historical change of a property relationship.

All property relations in the past have continually been subject to historical change consequent upon the change in historical conditions.

The French Revolution, for example, abolished feudal property in favour of bourgeois property.

The distinguishing feature of Communism is not the abolition of property generally, but the abolition of bourgeois property. But modern bourgeois private property is the final and most complete expression of the system of producing and appropriating products, that is based on class antagonisms, on the exploitation of the many by the few.

In this sense, the theory of the Communists may be summed up in the single sentence: Abolition of private property.

– Marx & Engels: Library: 1848: The Communist Manifesto: Chapter 2

Generally, in Marxism, private property is understood as property that is used by bourgeoisie to increase capital.

== Crown property ==
In the modern representative democracy, "public property" is said to be owned by the people as a commons or held in trust by the government for common benefit. In many Commonwealth realms, such property is said to be owned by the Crown. Examples include Crown land, Crown copyright, and Crown Dependencies.

== Examples ==
=== USSR ===
According to the 1977 Constitution of the Soviet Union:

State property, i. e. the common property of the Soviet people, is the principal form of socialist property.

The land, its minerals, waters, and forests are the exclusive property of the state. The state owns the basic means of production in industry, construction, and agriculture; means of transport and communication; the banks; the property of state-run trade organisations and public utilities, and other state-run undertakings; most urban housing; and other property necessary for state purposes.

– Article 11

But "public property" itself as a separate form was not foreseen, instead there was social ownership of the means of production.

=== United States ===
In Alaska since the 1950s was working off the model of public property in the resource sector. There was almost one third of the state with huge reserves of oil. For the realization of the right onto the public property in 1976 was founded Alaska Permanent Fund, which included 25% of the annual fee of the incomes of private oil-producing companies.

That fund is the public property of the state population.What is expressed in payment of dividends to all citizens(except convicted criminals). The average value of the dividends is between $600 and $1500, for the 2020 it was $992.

=== Canada ===
In Canada, the Public Debt and Property are under the exclusive legislative authority of the parliament of Canada, rather than the Queen or the local authority, according to the Constitution Acts, 1867 and 1982, article 91.

=== Common land ===
Common land was in a public usage of a village community for cattle breeding, growing cereals, fishing. Forest lands were used for timber extraction.

== See also ==
- Constitutional economics
- Municipalization
- Nationalization
- Public good (economics)
- Public sector
- Public space
- Public trust doctrine
- Res extra commercium
- Social capital
- State-owned enterprise
- Public domain in French public law
