= Private property =

Property owned by non-governmental legal entities

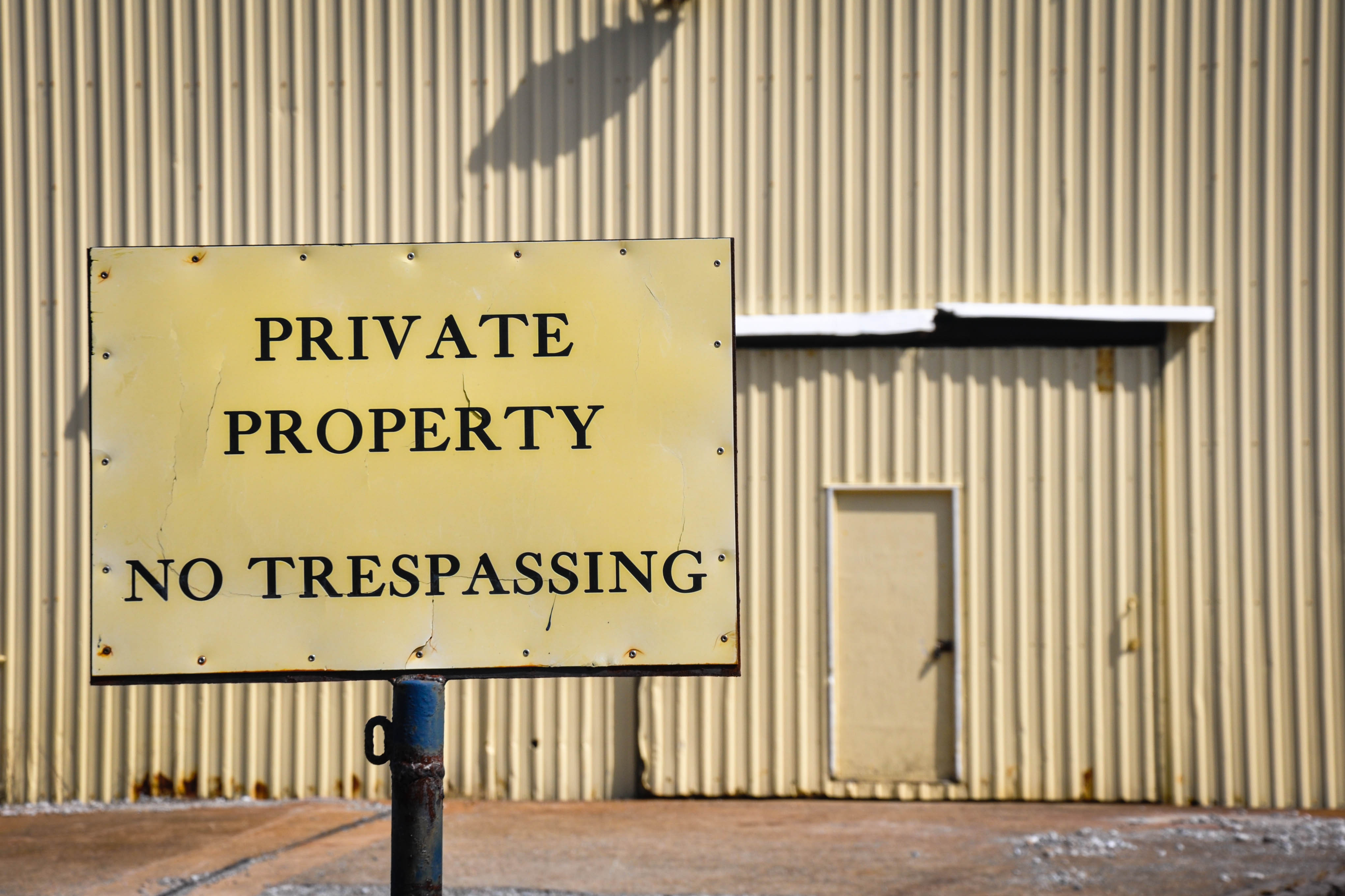
Private property sign in Nova Scotia, Canada

Private property is a legal designation for the ownership of property by non-governmental legal entities. Private property is distinguishable from public property, which is owned by a state entity, and from collective or cooperative property, which is owned by one or more non-governmental entities. Private property is foundational to capitalism, an economic system based on the private ownership of the means of production and their operation for profit. As a legal concept, private property is defined and enforced by a country's political system.

== History ==
In absolute antiquity, the native Mesopotamians had no term for the concept of property. The majority of legal documents from Mesopotamia, however, are overwhelmingly concerned with the proper disposition of what modern people would call "property" and with ensuring legal, unchallengeable, and fair treatment of individuals with property claims. While there were no laws prohibiting the alienation—that is, the buying and selling—of land, written records from Mesopotamia indicate a tendency against it. Measures were taken to keep land within a family and to prevent it from being broken down into plots too small to be viable agriculturally.

Written discussions of private property arguably emerged in the Western tradition at least as far back as Plato. Before the 18th century, English speakers generally used "property" to refer to land ownership. In England, "property" came to have a legal definition in the 17th century. Private property, defined as property owned by commercial entities, emerged with the great European trading companies of the 17th century. The issue of the enclosure of agricultural land in England, especially as debated in the 17th and 18th centuries, accompanied efforts in philosophy and political thought—by Thomas Hobbes (1588–1679), James Harrington (1611–1677), and John Locke (1632–1704), for example—to address the phenomenon of property ownership.

In arguing against supporters of absolute monarchy, Locke conceptualized property as a natural right that God had not bestowed exclusively upon the monarchy. In his labor theory of property, Locke stated that property is a natural result of labor improving upon nature, and thus, by labor expenditure, the laborer becomes entitled to its produce. Influenced by the rise of mercantilism, Locke argued that private property was antecedent to, and thus independent of, government. Locke distinguished between "common property", by which he meant common land, and property in consumer goods and producer goods. His chief argument for property in land ownership was that it led to improved land management and cultivation compared with common land.

In the 18th century, during the Industrial Revolution, the moral philosopher and economist Adam Smith (1723–1790), in contrast to Locke, distinguished between the "right to property" as an acquired right and natural rights. Smith confined natural rights to "liberty and life". Smith also drew attention to the relationship between employee and employer and identified that property and civil government were dependent upon each other, recognizing that "the state of property must always vary with the form of government". Smith further argued that civil government could not exist without property, as the government's main function was to define and safeguard property ownership.

In the 19th century, German economist and philosopher Karl Marx (1818–1883) provided an influential analysis of the development and history of property formations and their relationship to the technical productive forces of a given period. Marx's conception of private property has proven influential for many subsequent economic theories and for communist, socialist, and anarchist political movements and has led to the widespread association of private property, particularly private property in the means of production, with capitalism.

In the 20th century, theories of private property were further developed within the tradition of classical and economic liberalism. Libertarian economists such as Ludwig von Mises and Friedrich Hayek emphasized the role of private property as a foundational institution for economic calculation, market coordination, and individual liberty. Building on earlier natural-rights arguments, some theorists such as Murray Rothbard explained property rights as originating through first use and continuing through voluntary exchange between individuals, independent of state authority. In this view, often associated with anarcho-capitalism, property rights are seen as the basis for a system of law and social order that can emerge without centralized government, with markets and contractual arrangements providing the primary mechanisms for the allocation and transfer of resources.

== Legal and real-world aspects ==
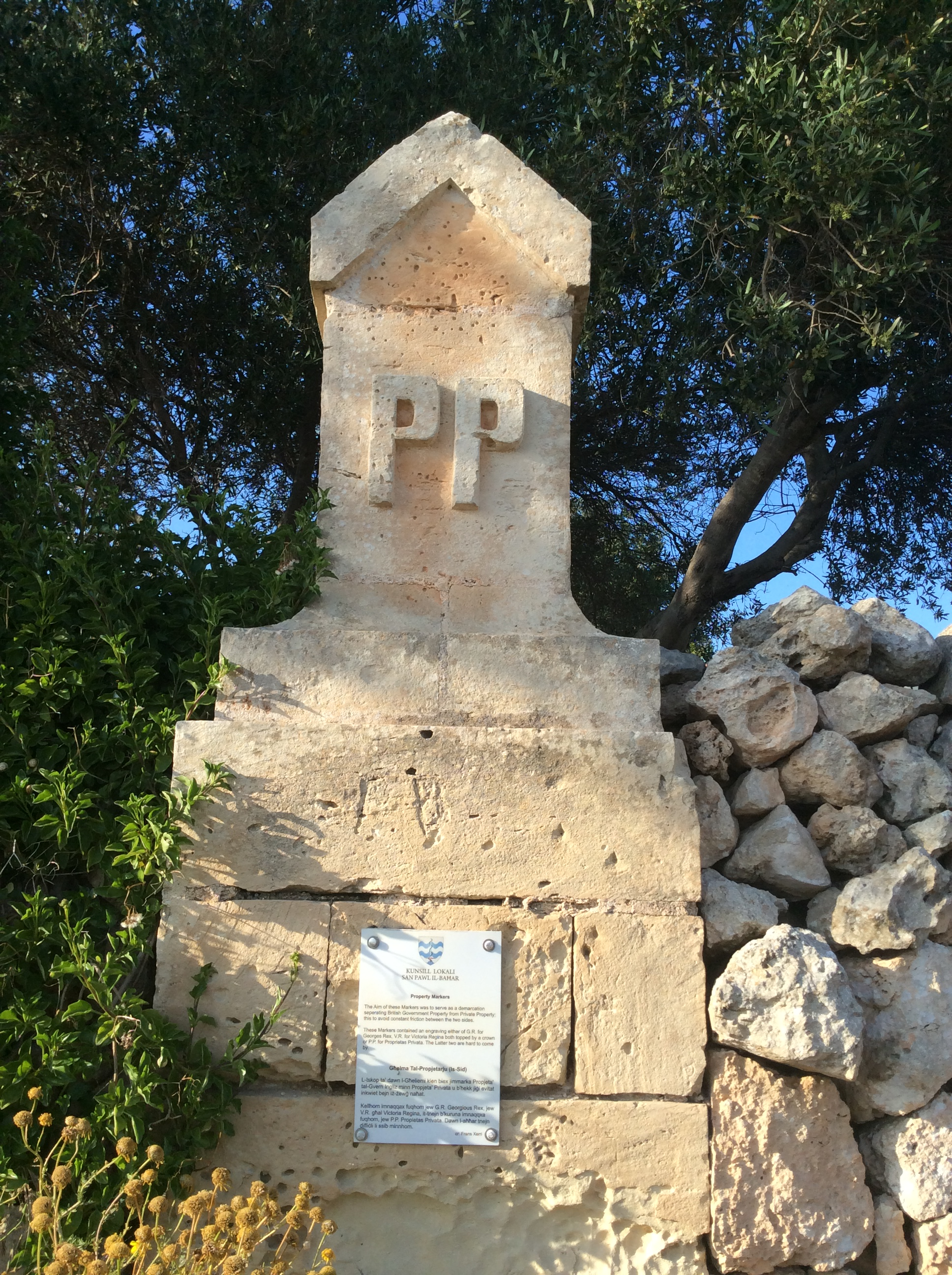
Proprietas Privata (PP) British period marker in San Martin, St. Paul's Bay, Malta

Private property is a legal concept defined and enforced by a country's legal and political institutions. Theories of property rights differ regarding whether such rights originate from law, custom, contract, or natural rights. The area of law that deals with the subject is called property law. Governments typically fund the courts, law enforcement agencies, and administrative institutions that enforce property law through public revenues. Defence of property is a common method of justification used by defendants who argue that they should not be held liable for any loss or injury that they have caused because they were acting to protect their property. Courts in many jurisdictions have recognized limited rights to use force in defense of property, subject to statutory and judicial restrictions.

In many jurisdictions, governments impose taxes on property ownership. A property tax is an ad valorem tax on the value of a property, usually levied on real estate. The tax is levied by the governing authority of the jurisdiction in which the property is located. It may be imposed annually or at the time of a real estate transaction, such as in a real estate transfer tax. Under a property tax system, the government requires or performs an appraisal of the monetary value of each property, and the tax is assessed in proportion to that value. The four broad types of property taxes are land, improvements to land (immovable human-made objects, such as buildings), personal property (movable human-made objects), and intangible property.

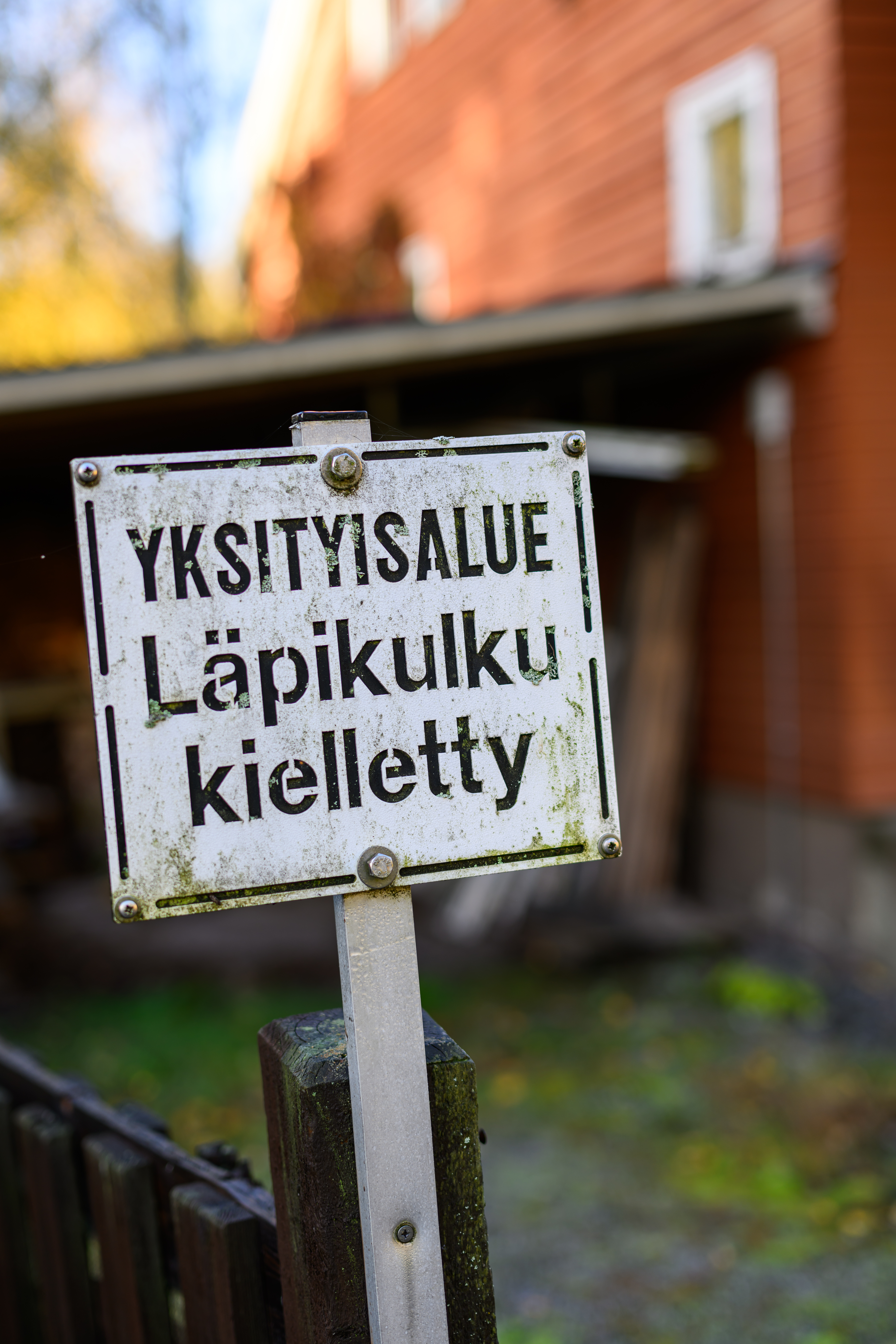
Private property sign in Helsinki, Finland

The social and political context in which private property is administered determines the extent to which an owner can exercise rights to it. The rights to private property often come with limitations. For example, local governments may enforce rules about what kind of building may be built on private land (building codes) or whether a historical building may be demolished. Theft is common in many societies, and the extent to which central administrations will pursue property crime varies enormously.

Some forms of private property are uniquely identifiable and may be described in a title or certificate of ownership. The rights to a property may be transferred from one owner to another. A transfer tax is a tax on the passing of title to property from one person or entity to another. An owner may request that, after death, private property be transferred to family members through inheritance. In certain cases, ownership may be lost in the public interest. Private real estate may be confiscated or used for public purposes, for example, to build a road.

== Theory ==
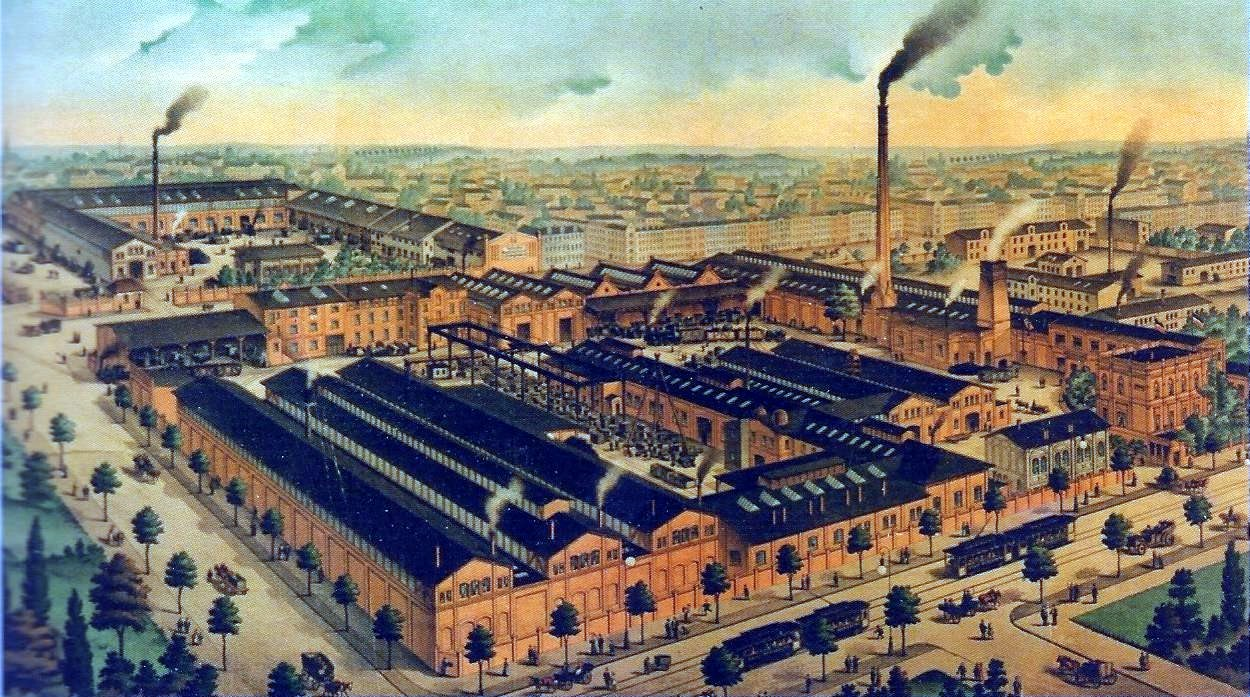
Factories and corporations are considered private property.

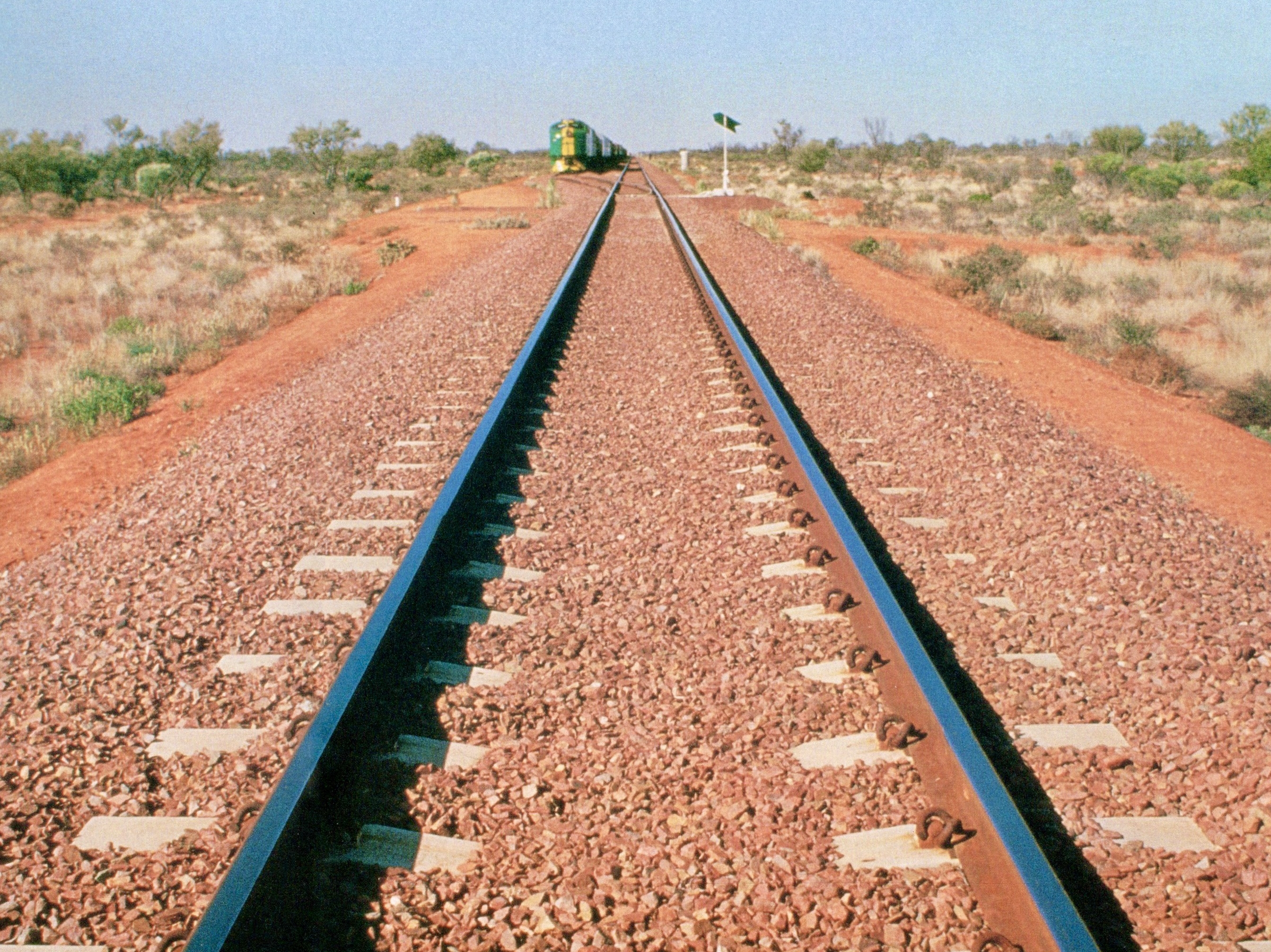
Railway tracks are also considered private property, as walking on them is illegal.

The legal framework of a country or society defines some of the practical implications of private property. There is no expectation that these rules will define a rational and consistent model of an economic or social system. Although contemporary neoclassical economics, currently the dominant school of economics, rejects some of the assumptions of the early philosophers underpinning classical economics, it has been argued that neoclassical economics continues to be influenced by the legacy of natural moral theory and the concept of natural rights, leading to the presentation of private market exchange and private property rights as "natural rights" inherent in nature.

Economic liberals, defined as those who support a private sector-driven market economy, consider private property to be essential for the construction of a prosperous society. They believe private ownership of land ensures that the land will be put to productive use and that its value is protected by the landowner. If owners must pay property taxes, this forces them to maintain productive use of the land to keep taxes current. Private property also attaches a monetary value to land, which can be used for trade or as collateral. Therefore, private property is an important part of capitalization within the economy.

Socialist economists are critical of private property in the means of production, as socialism aims to replace it with social ownership or public property. Socialists generally argue that private property relations limit the development of productive forces once production becomes increasingly collective, and some socialist theories maintain that economic functions traditionally performed by capitalists could be carried out through collective or social ownership. Socialists generally favor social ownership either to eliminate class distinctions between owners and workers or as a component of the development of a post-capitalist economic system.

In response to the socialist critique, the Austrian School economist Ludwig von Mises argued that private property rights are a prerequisite for what he called rational economic calculation and that the prices of goods and services cannot be determined accurately enough to allow efficient economic calculation without clearly defined private property rights. Mises argued that a socialist system, which by definition would lack private property in the factors of production, would be unable to determine appropriate price signals for the factors of production. According to Mises, this problem would make rational socialist economic calculation impossible.

In capitalism, ownership can be viewed as a "bundle of rights" over an asset that entitles its holder to a strong form of authority over it. Such a bundle is composed of a set of rights that allows the owner of the asset to control it and decide on its use, claim the value generated by it, exclude others from using it, and transfer ownership of it to another holder. In Marxian economics and socialist politics, a distinction is made between "private property" and "personal property". The former is defined as the means of production involving private ownership over an economic enterprise based on socialized production and wage labor, whereas the latter is defined as consumer goods or goods produced by an individual. Before the 18th century, "private property" usually referred to land ownership.

== Criticism ==
Private property in the means of production is the central element of capitalism criticized by socialists. In Marxist literature, private property refers to a social relationship in which the property owner takes possession of anything that another person or group produces with that property and capitalism depends on private property. The socialist critique of private ownership is heavily influenced by the Marxist analysis of capitalist property forms as part of its broader critique of alienation and exploitation in capitalism. Although there is considerable disagreement among socialists about the validity of certain aspects of Marxist analysis, the majority of socialists are sympathetic to Marx's views on exploitation and alienation.

Socialists critique the private appropriation of property income because such income does not correspond to a return on any productive activity and is generated by the working class; it represents exploitation. The bourgeoisie, the property-owning (capitalist) class, lives off passive property income produced by the proletariat (working population) by their claim to ownership in the form of stock or private equity. This exploitative arrangement is perpetuated due to the structure of capitalist society. Capitalism is regarded as a class system akin to historical class systems like slavery and feudalism.

Private ownership has been criticized on non-Marxist ethical grounds by advocates of market socialism. According to the economist James Yunker, the ethical case for market socialism is that because passive property income requires no mental or physical exertion on the part of the recipient, and its appropriation by a small group of private owners is the source of the vast inequalities in contemporary capitalism, social ownership in a market economy would resolve the major cause of social inequality and its accompanying social ills. Weyl and Posner argue that private property is another name for monopoly and can hamper allocative efficiency. Through the use of taxation and modified Vickrey auctions, they argue that partial common property ownership is a more efficient and just way to organize the economy.

The justifications for private property rights have also been critiqued as tools of empire that enable land appropriation. According to academic commentator Brenna Bhandar, the language implemented in property legislation dictates colonized peoples as unable to effectively own and utilize their land. It is suggested that personal rights are interchangeable with property rights; therefore communities that utilize communal methods of land ownership are not equally validated by private property ideals. It is also argued by critical race theorist Cheryl Harris that race and property rights have been conflated over time, with only those qualities unique to white settlement recognized legally. Indigenous use of land, focusing on common ownership, is distinguished from private property ownership and Western understandings of land law.

== See also ==
- Common ownership
- Enclosure
- Personal property
- Property
- Property income
- Property rights (economics)
- Public property
- Rule of law
- Public domain in French public law
