= Ordinance of Marine =

Great Royal Ordinance codifying maritime transport

The Great Ordinance of Marine of August 1681, (French: grande ordonnance de la marine d'août 1681) also called the marine code, is a royal ordinance drafted under the reign of Louis XIV, which comprehensively codifies practices in maritime transport (shipping). Inspired by the customs and statutes of the United Provinces (Amsterdam and Antwerp), it was established under the administration of Colbert.

The order is divided into five books, themselves divided into several parts and chapters:

1. The Officers of the Admiralty
2. People and Marine Vessels,
3. Maritime contracts, Charter parties, covenants, rent commitments and sailors, loans, insurance, take
4. Police, ports, coasts, harbors, and shores
5. Sea Fisheries

There is also an order of the navy in April 1689 for the navy and naval arsenals.
