= Waste transfer station =

Site that begins the processing of waste and recyclables

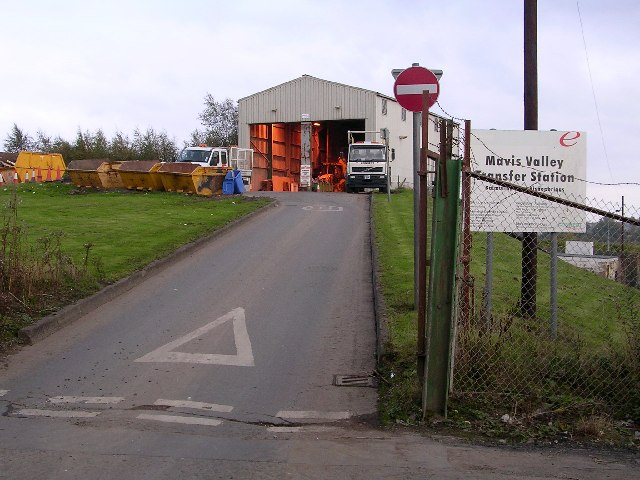
Mavis Valley Transfer Station in East Dunbartonshire, Scotland

A waste transfer station, or resource recovery centre, is a building or processing site for the temporary deposition, consolidation and aggregation of waste, between community and disposal terminals. Their presence has both positive and negative affects to society. The sites can move waste of thousands of tonnes per year.

== Ownership ==
Transfer stations can be publicly or privately owned. They vary in size, from small regional sites managing less than 1000 tonnes yearly to large sites managing over 200,000 tonnes yearly.

== Location ==
The location of waste transfer stations is often aimed at minimizing the cost to operating cost of the whole waste treatment system. In addition, the location of a waste transfer station can limit its negative impact to the environment.

== Effects ==
=== Negative effects ===
==== Health effects ====
Waste transfer stations can sometimes release odorous gases and bioaerosols can escape from them. These can negatively affect their surroundings and can attribute to health risks of citizens in an area.

=== Positive effects ===
==== Sanitation benefits ====
Lack of waste transfer stations in urban areas has posed efficiency of waste collection and disposal issues for cities. The stations can enhance environmental performance of waste management by decreasing the energy use and the quantity of air pollutants released during waste collection and transportation.

==== Lower expenses ====
Waste transfer stations can the lower expenses of the waste management system, lessening the cost of relocating the waste to a different location.

==== Easier management ====
Waste transfer stations can also aid the screening and sorting of waste before it is disposed into landfills, making them more convenient and easily accessible centers for public use.

== See also ==
- List of solid waste treatment technologies
- Materials recovery facility
- Mechanical biological treatment
- Resource recovery
