= Thermal treatment =

Type of waste treatment technology

Thermal treatment is any waste treatment technology that involves high temperatures in the processing of the waste feedstock. Commonly this involves the combustion of waste materials.

Systems that are generally considered to be thermal treatment include:

- Cement kiln
- Gasification
- Incineration
- Mechanical heat treatment
- Pyrolysis
- Thermal depolymerization
- Waste autoclaves

== See also ==
- Anaerobic digestion
- List of solid waste treatment technologies
- Mechanical biological treatment
- Waste-to-energy
- Pyrolysis
