= Waste collection =

Transfer of refuse from origin to treatment or landfill facility

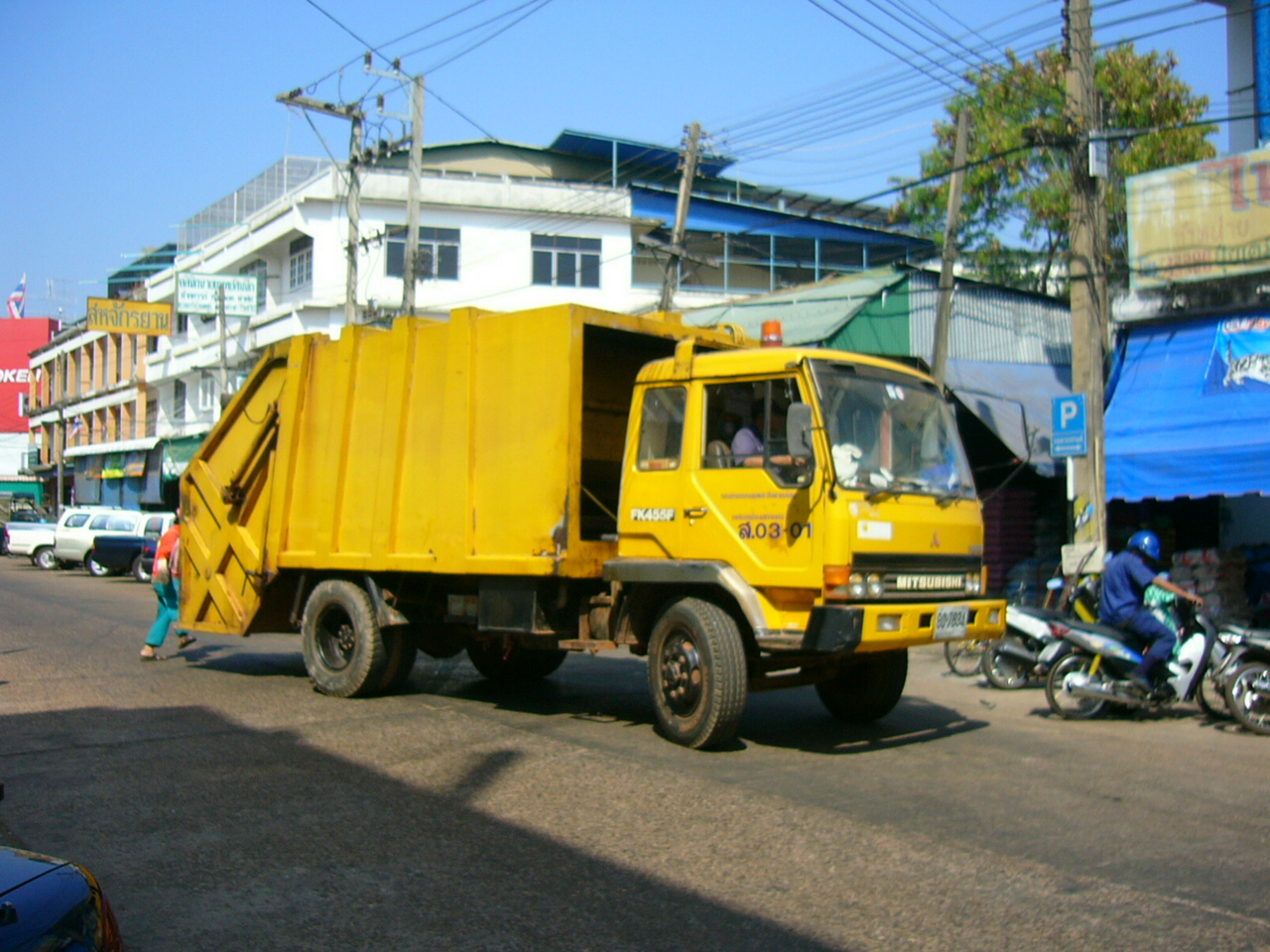
A waste collection vehicle in Sakon Nakhon, Thailand.

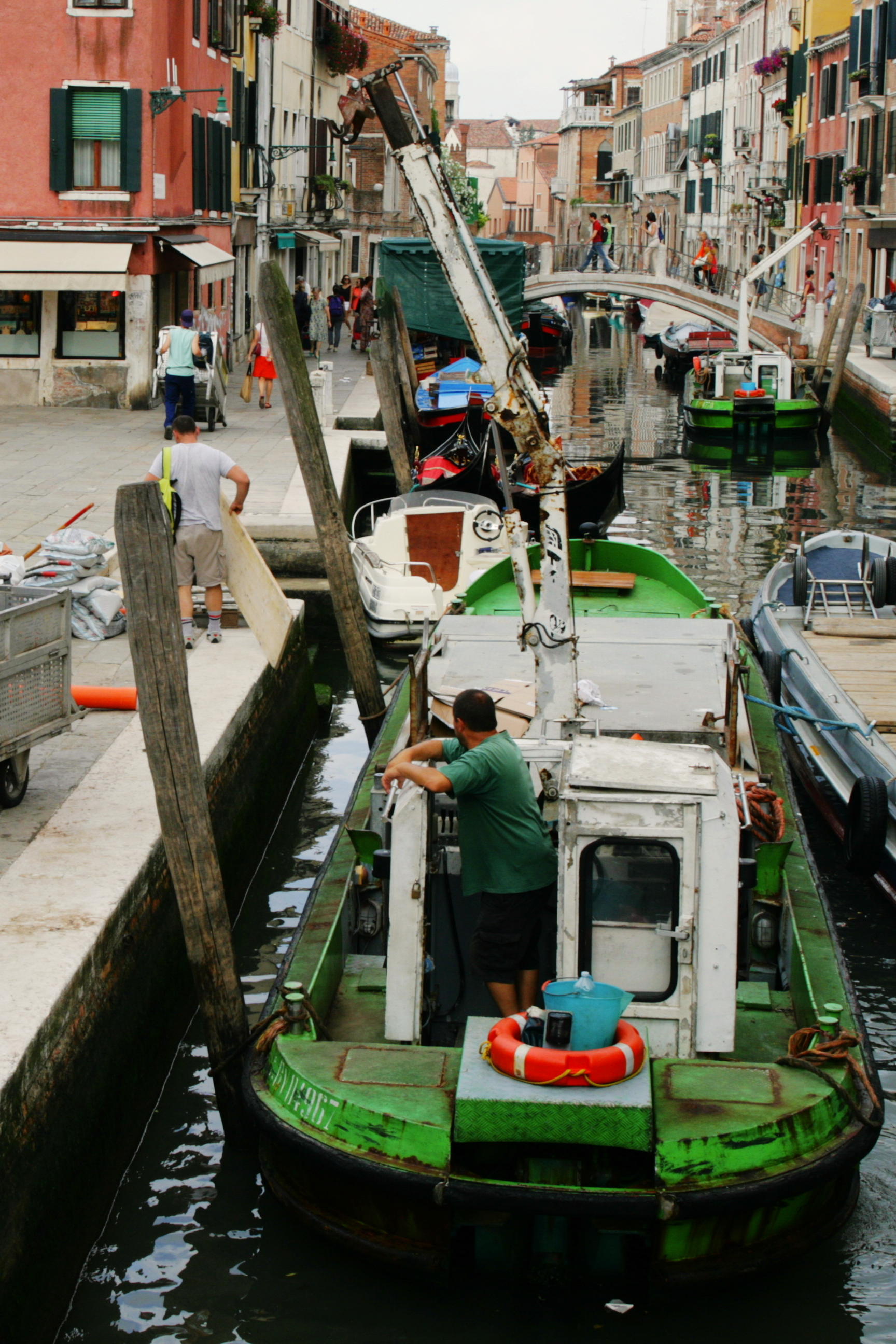
A waste collection barge in Venice, Italy.

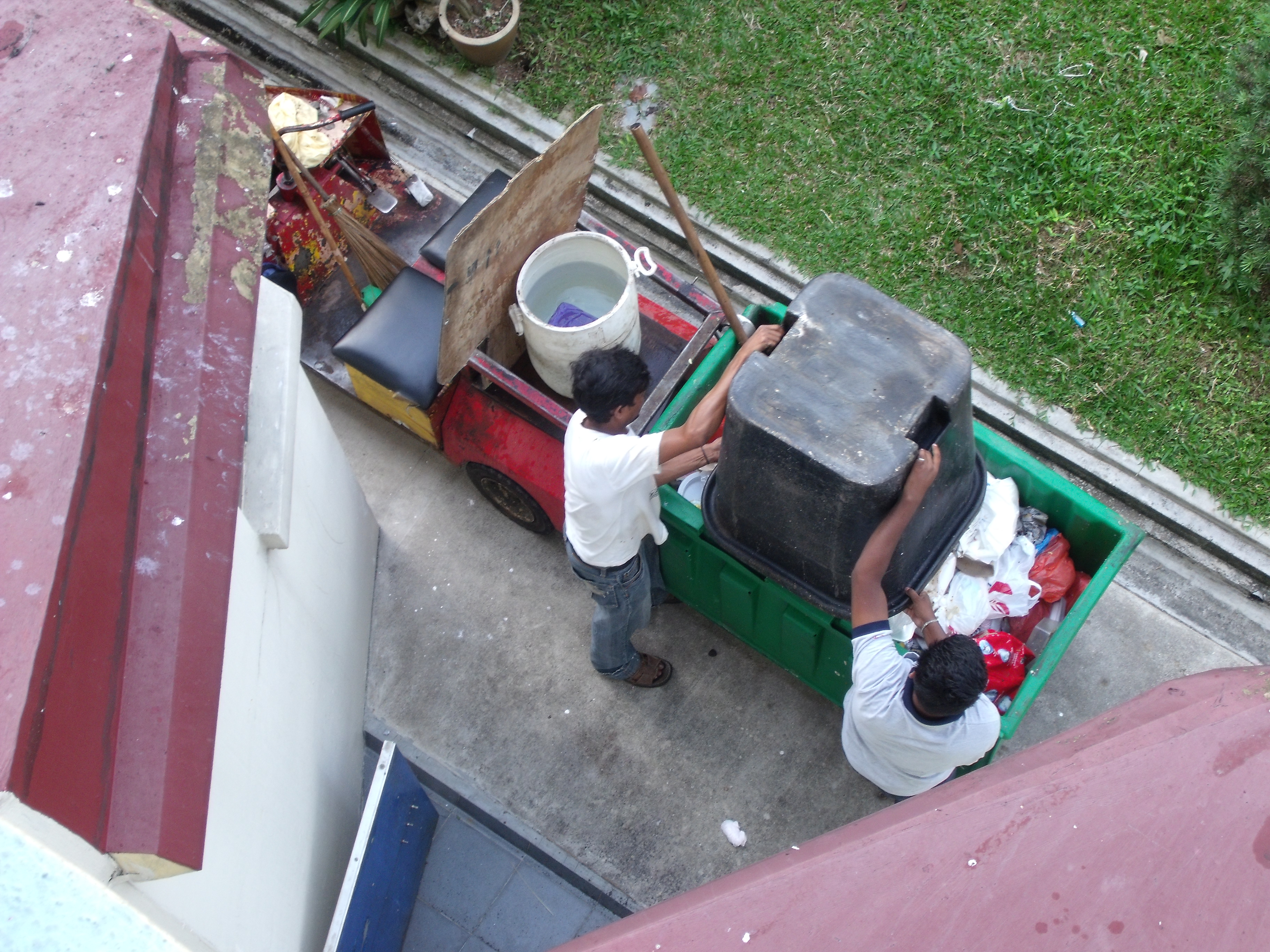
Manual waste collection in Bukit Batok West, Singapore.

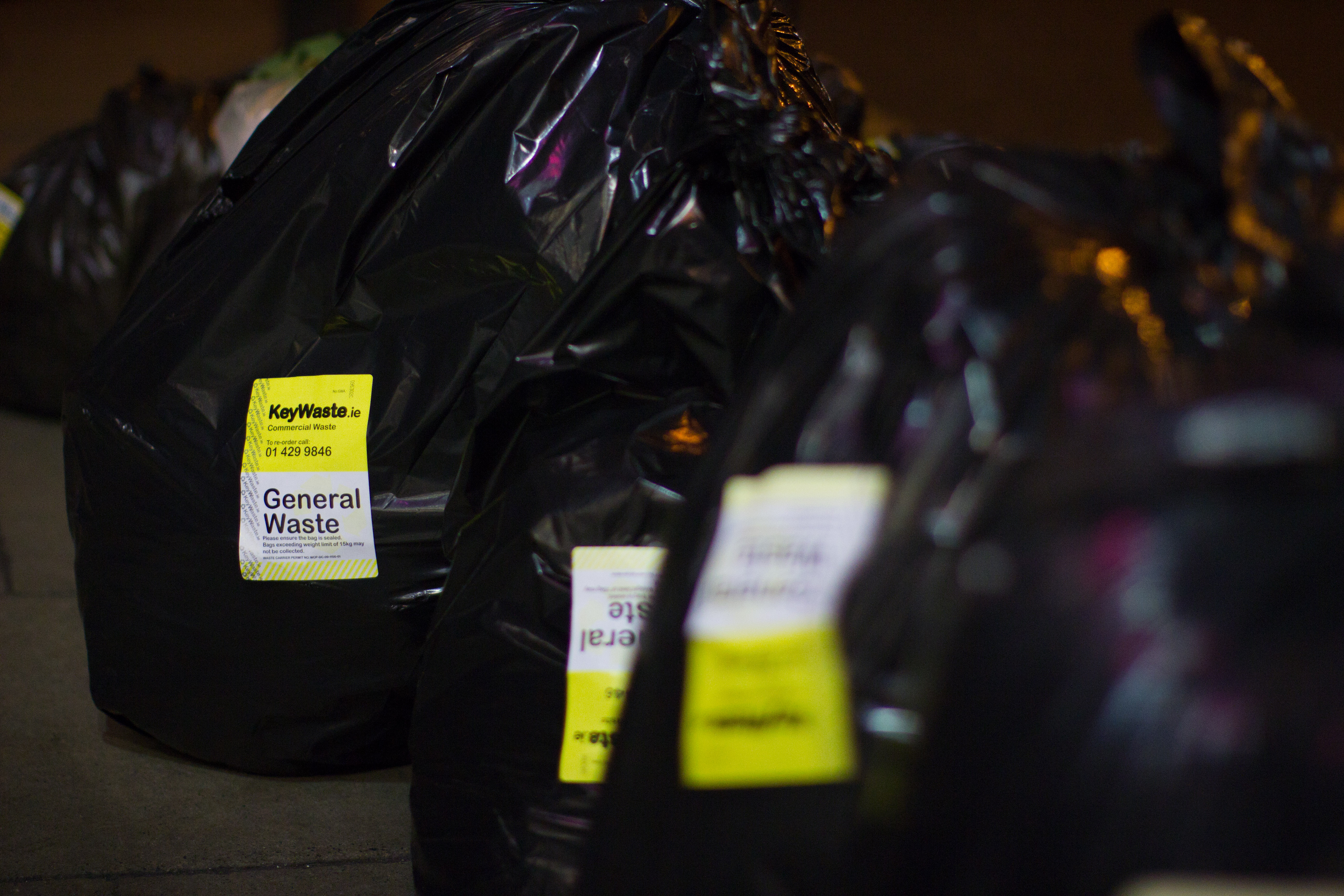
Waste on a sidewalk for collection, bagged and stickered - in Dublin, Ireland

Waste collection is a part of the process of waste management. It is the transfer of solid waste from the point of use and disposal to the point of treatment or landfill. Waste collection also includes the curbside collection of recyclable materials that technically are not waste, as part of a municipal landfill diversion program.

== Household waste ==
Household waste in economically developed countries will generally be left in waste containers or recycling bins prior to collection by a waste collector using a waste collection vehicle. Waste collection barges are used in some towns, for example in Venice, Italy.

However, in many developing countries, such as Mexico and Egypt, waste left in bins or bags at the side of the road will not be removed unless residents interact with the waste collectors.

Mexico City residents must haul their trash to a waste collection vehicle which makes frequent stops around each neighborhood. The waste collectors will indicate their readiness by ringing a distinctive bell and possibly shouting. Residents line up and hand their trash container to the waste collector. A tip may be expected in some neighborhoods. Private contracted waste collectors may circulate in the same neighborhoods as many as five times per day, pushing a cart with a waste container, ringing a bell and shouting to announce their presence. These private contractors are not paid a salary, and survive only on the tips they receive. Later, they meet up with a waste collection vehicle to deposit their accumulated waste.

== Safety and price considerations ==
Waste collection considerations of waste during different types of waste and size of bins, positioning of the bins, and how often bins are to be serviced. Overfilled bins result in rubbish falling out while being tipped. Hazardous rubbish like empty petrol cans can cause fires igniting other trash when the truck compactor is operating. Bins may be locked or stored in secure areas to avoid having non-paying parties placing rubbish in the bin.

If waste collection is not carried out properly, it can lead to environmental pollution. This includes the breeding of animals and insects, and can eventually lead to the spread of disease. Usually waste is burned, however this leads to a bigger problem when it comes to air pollution. This can eventually create health issues to people in the surrounding areas.

== Employment as garbage collector ==
According to USNews,

The Bureau of Labor Statistics projects 3.2% employment growth for garbage collectors between 2022 and 2032. In that period, an estimated 4,700 jobs should open up.

== See also ==
- History of waste management
- Automated vacuum collection
- Beach cleaner
- Dempster Brothers (manufacturer of Dempster Dinosaur and Dempster Dumpmaster waste collection vehicles)
- List of waste management acronyms
- Sanitation worker
- Waste bin
- Waste sorting
