= Waste sorting =

Environmental practice of separating waste categories to make it easy to recycle

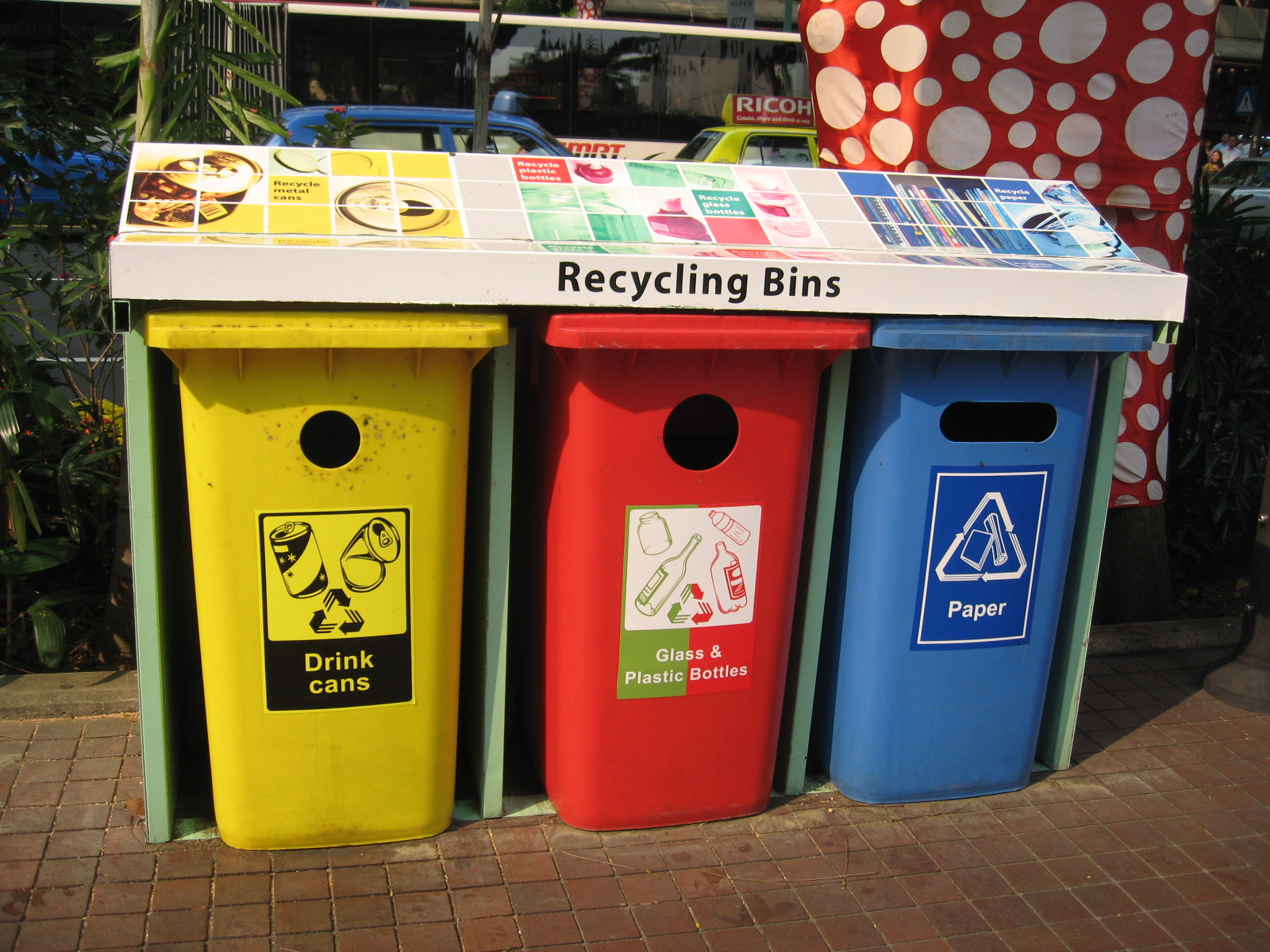
Recycling bins in Singapore

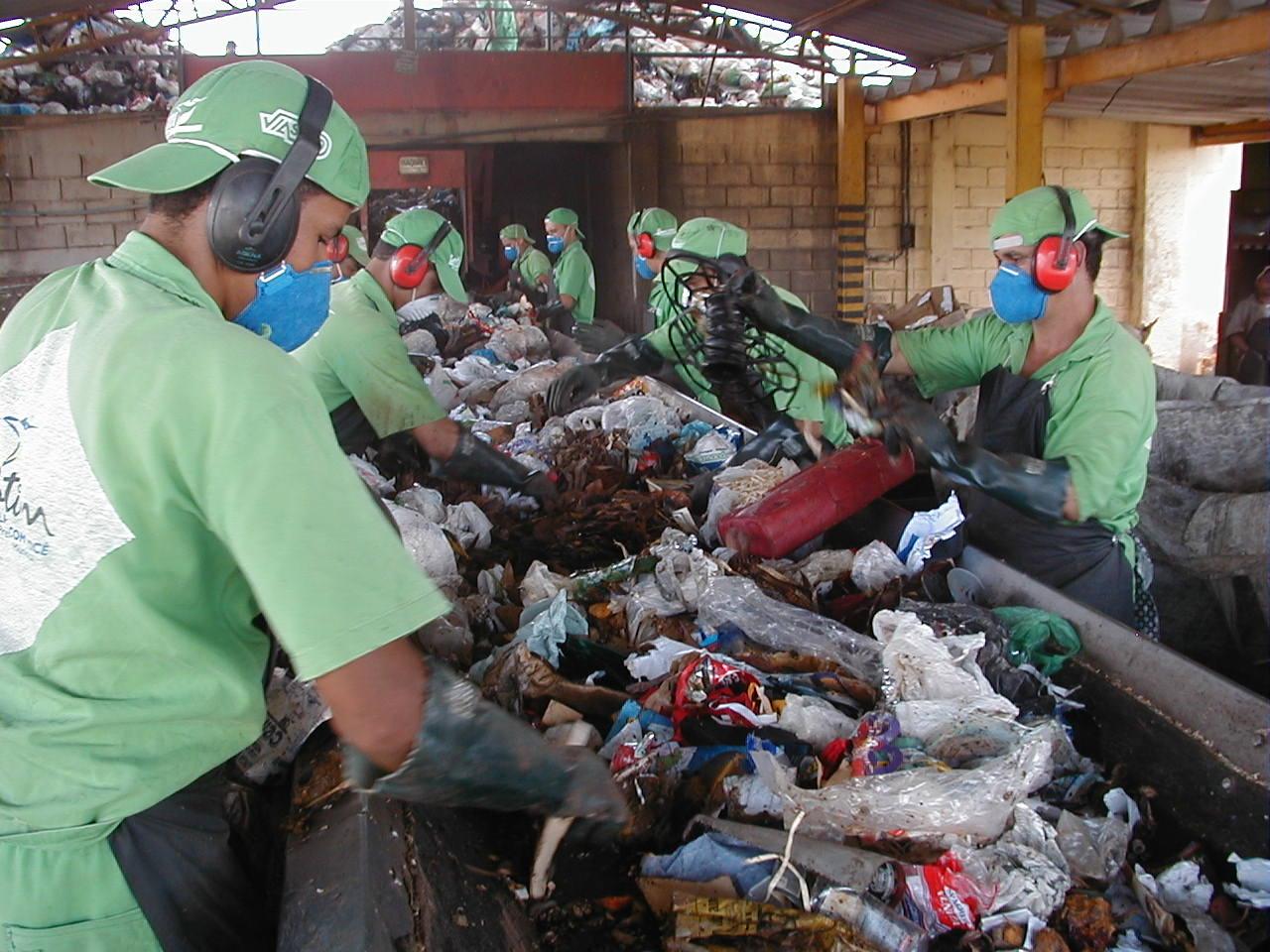
Manual waste sorting for recycling

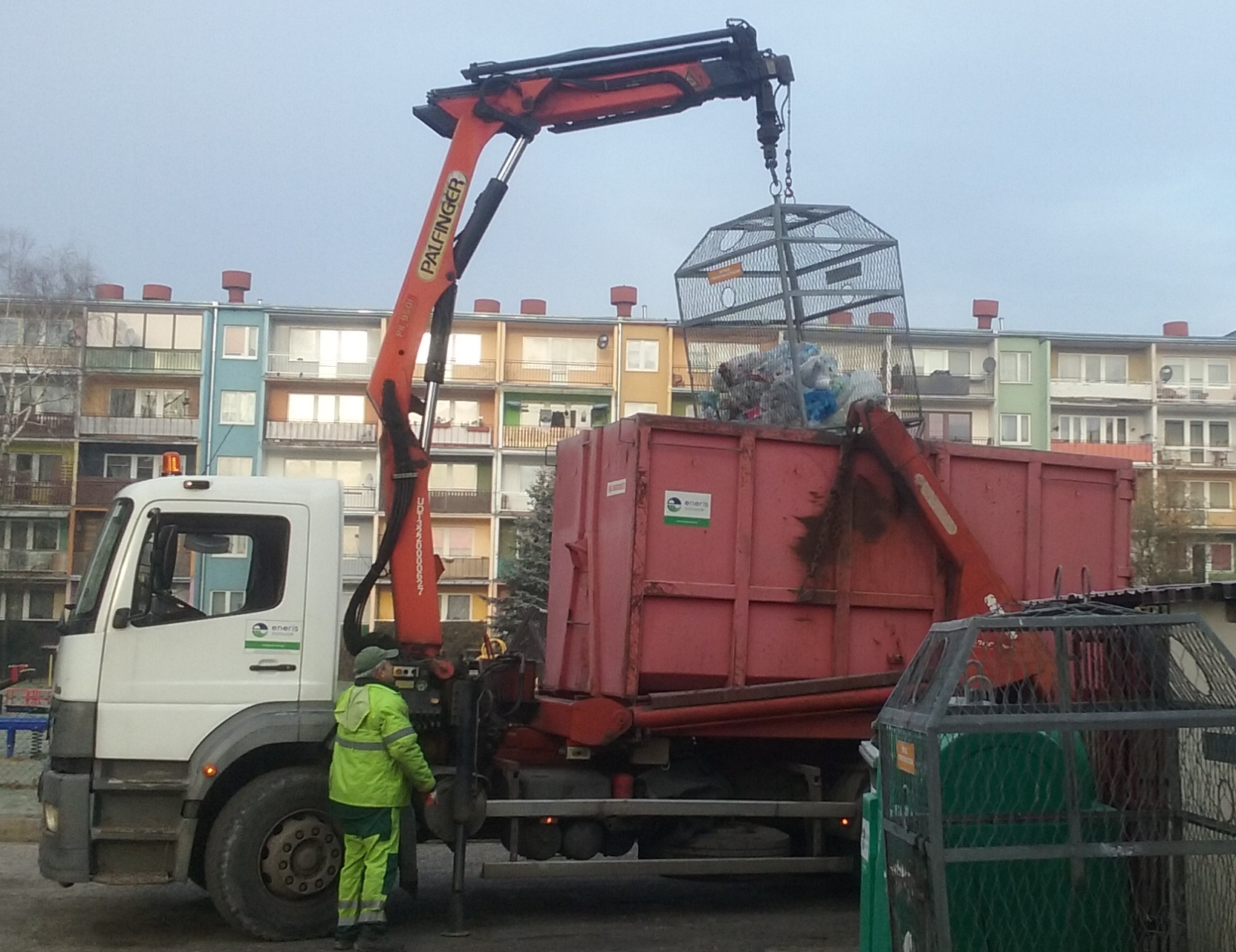
Emptying of segregated rubbish containers in Polish medium-sized city Tomaszów Mazowiecki

Waste sorting is the process by which waste is separated into different elements. Waste sorting can occur manually at the household and collected through curbside collection schemes, or automatically separated in materials recovery facilities or mechanical biological treatment systems. Hand sorting was the first method used in the history of waste sorting. Waste can also be sorted in a civic amenity site.

Waste segregation is the division of waste into dry and wet. Dry waste includes wood and related products, metals and glass. Wet waste typically refers to organic waste usually generated by eating establishments and are heavy in weight due to dampness. With segregation, each form of waste goes into its category at the point of dumping or collection, but sorting happens after dumping or collection. Segregation of waste ensures pure, quality material. Sorting on the other hand will end up producing impure materials with less quality.

These days, automatic waste segregators are gaining popularity and are already being used in many parts of the world like Australia.

== Methods ==
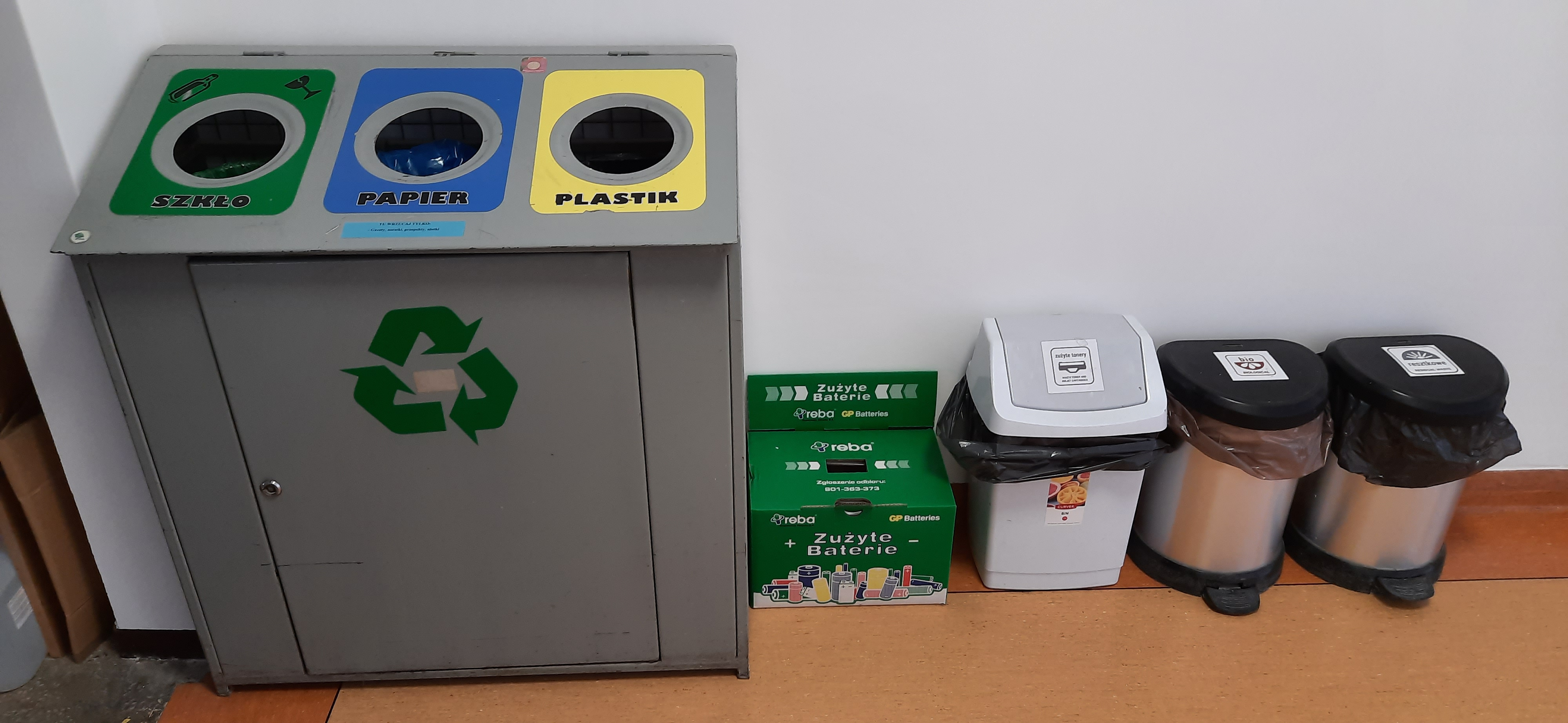
Recycling point at the Gdańsk University of Technology

Waste is collected at its source in each area and separated. The way that waste is sorted must reflect local disposal systems. The following categories are common:

- Paper
- Cardboard (including packaging for return to suppliers)
- Glass (clear, tinted–no light bulbs or window panes, which belong with residual waste)
- Plastics
- Textiles
- Wood, leather, rubber
- Scrap metal
- Compost (often including food scraps and other organic kitchen waste)
- Special/hazardous waste
- Residual waste

Organic waste can also be segregated for disposal:

- Leftover food which has had any contact with meat can be collected separately to prevent the spread of bacteria.
  - Meat and bone can be retrieved by bodies responsible for animal waste.
  - If other leftovers are sent, for example, to local farmers, they can be sterilised before being fed to the animals.
- Peels and scrapings from fruit and vegetables can be composted along with other degradable matter. Other waste can be included for composting, such as cut flowers, corks, coffee grounds, rotting fruit, tea bags, eggshells and nutshells, and paper towels.

=== Mechanisms for automated sorting ===
Automation of municipal solid waste sorting process is an active research area. Notable mechanisms for automated sorting include:

- Standardization of products, especially of packaging which are often composed of different materials, in particular materials hard or currently impossible to either separate or recycle together in an automated way.
  - Laws related to recyclability, waste management, domestic materials recovery facilities, product composition, biodegradability and prevention of import/export of specific wastes.
    - Since around 2017, China, Turkiye, Malaysia, Cambodia, and Thailand have banned certain waste imports. It has been suggested that such bans may increase automation and recycling, decreasing negative impacts on the environment. These bans have significantly disrupted global waste flows, forcing exporting countries to improve their domestic sorting capabilities and invest in advanced automation to meet higher quality standards for recycled materials, as contaminated bales are less likely to find export markets.
- Optical sorting
  - Spectral imaging based sorting
    - Systems that use hyperspectral imaging and algorithms developed via machine learning
  - Near infrared spectroscopy
  - X-ray based sorting
  - Laser-induced breakdown spectroscopy
- Eddy current separator based sorting
- Magnetic Separation (Beyond just Eddy Current)
  - Ferrous Metal Separation
    - Uses powerful permanent magnets or electromagnets, typically placed over or under conveyor belts, to lift and separate ferrous metals (steel, iron) from the mixed waste stream. This is often one of the first separation steps in an MRF.
  - Distinction from Eddy Current
    - Eddy current is specifically for non-ferrous metals. Standard magnetic separation is for ferrous metals. Both are magnetic but use different principles for different metal types.
- Density Separation (Wet or Dry)
  - Wet Density Separation (Float-Sink Tanks)
    - Materials are fed into a tank filled with water or a liquid of a specific density. Materials denser than the liquid sink, while less dense materials float. Multiple stages with different liquid densities can achieve finer separation. Commonly used for separating mixed plastics (e.g., PET sinks while PE/PP float in water), separating glass from plastics, or removing heavy contaminants.
  - Dry Density Separation (Air Tables / Wind Shifters)
    - Uses air currents and vibration to separate materials based on their specific gravity and aerodynamic profile. Lighter materials are carried further by the air. Separating light fractions (film plastic, paper) from heavy fractions (rigid plastics, organics), cleaning compost, or separating construction and demolition waste.

== By country ==
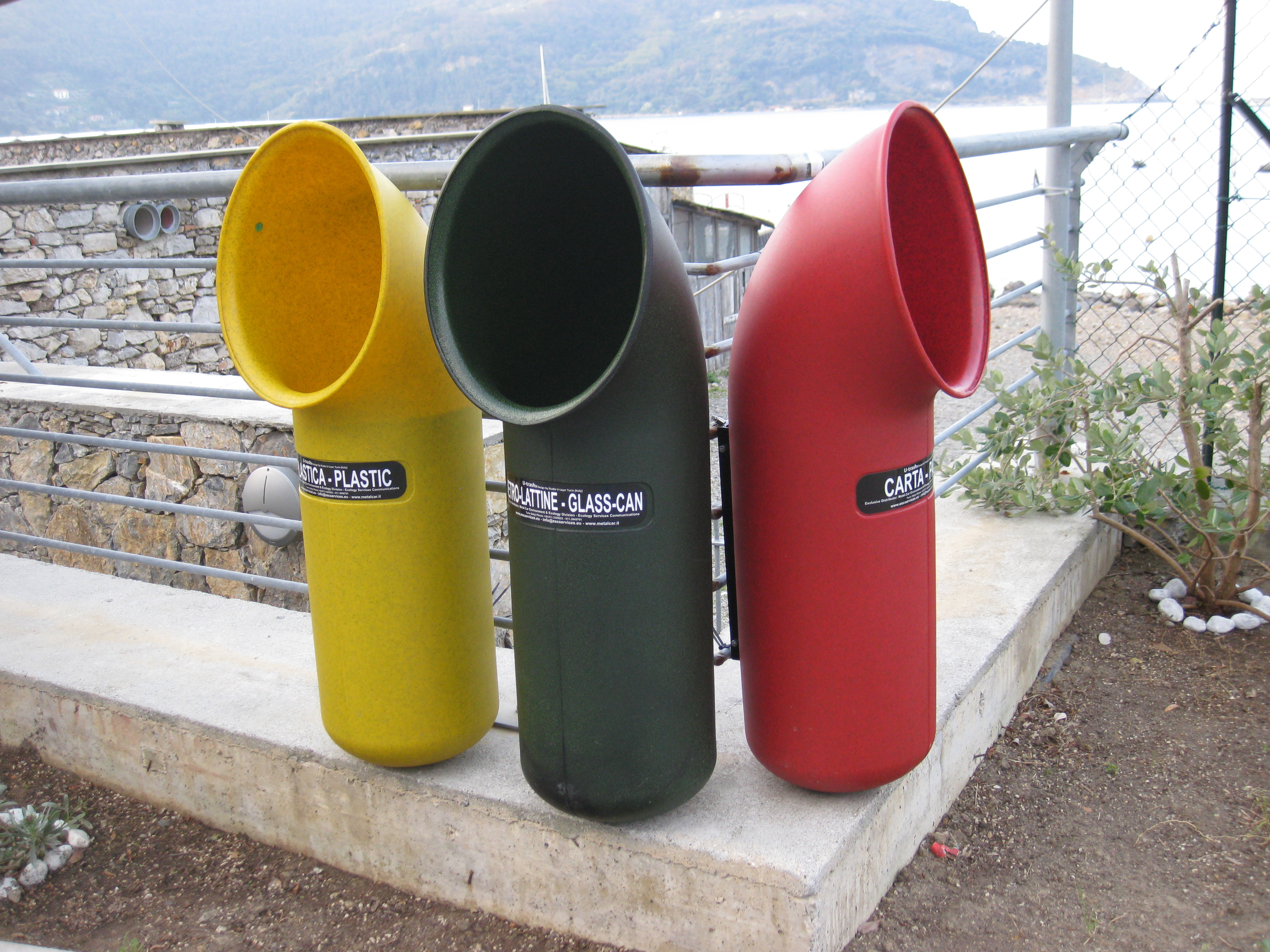
Characteristic containers for recycling in Portovenere, Italy

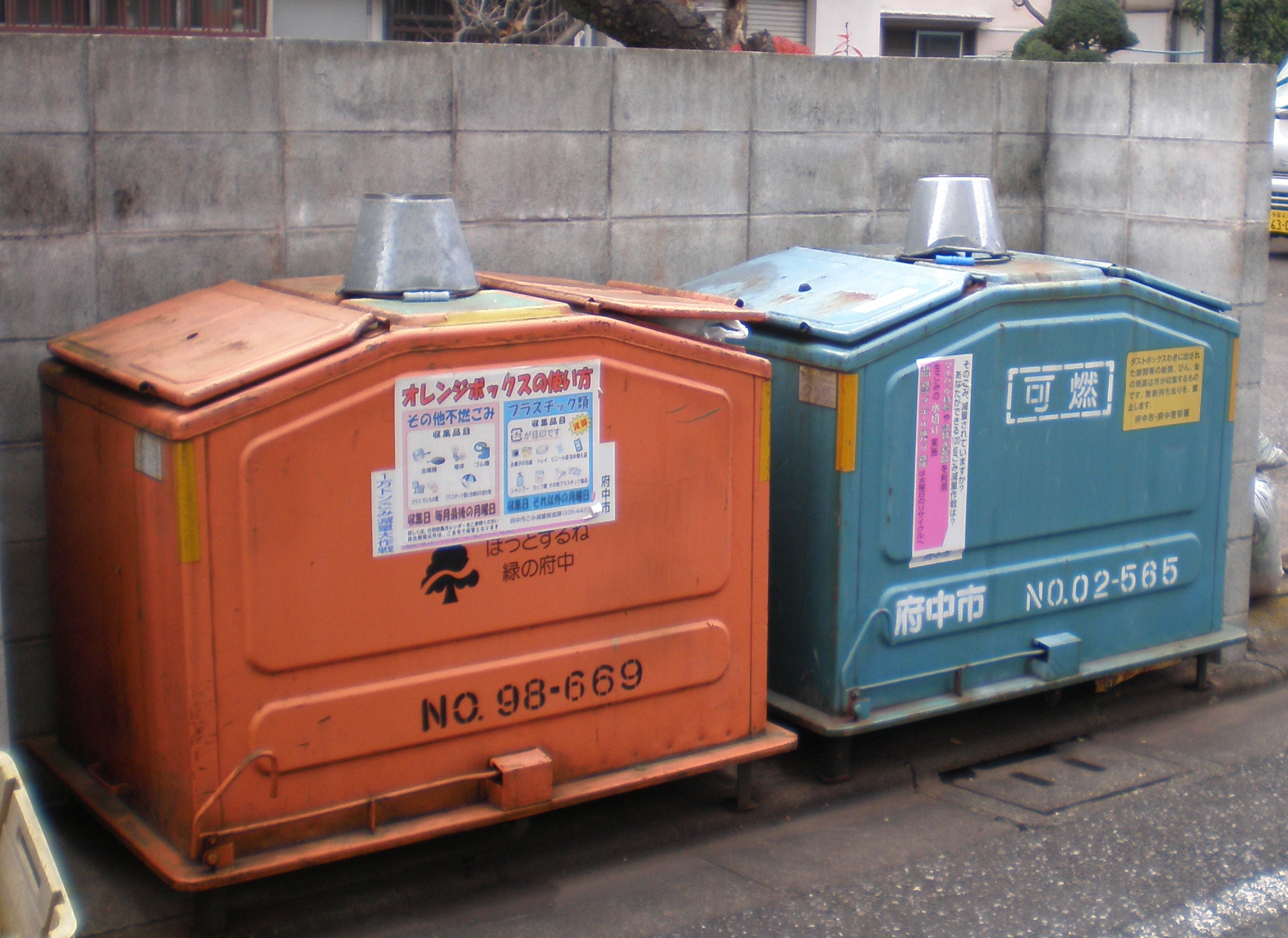
Garbage containers in Fuchū, Tokyo, Japan

In Germany, regulations exist that provide mandatory quotas for the waste sorting of packaging waste and recyclable materials such as glass bottles.

In Denpasar, Bali, Indonesia, a pilot project using an automated collecting machine of plastic bottles or aluminium cans with voucher reward has been implemented in a market.

In India, the government inaugurated the Swachh Bharat Mission ("Clean India Mission") in 2014, a nationwide cleanup effort. Before this national consolidated effort for systematic and total waste management came into common consciousness, many cities and towns in India had already launched individual efforts directed at municipal waste collection of segregated waste, either based on citizen activism and/or municipal efforts to set up sustainable systems.

In Ukraine, people are learning to sort garbage. Garbage is sorted in schools and kindergartens in Khmelnitsky.

In the United States, the Environmental Protection Agency reports that the infrastructure for recycling waste has not kept pace with the rate of waste production.

In Australia, Smart Bins have been introduced as a solution for waste management issues that the country faces. The AI-powered smart bin is equipped to segregate recyclables all by itself. Experts also claim that a smart bin like this may also increase waste-recovery rates in the country and help produce better quality recyclable products that will add to Australia's GDP.

In Turkiye, the 'Sıfır Atık' (Zero Waste) project, initiated and strongly promoted by the Ministry of Environment, Urbanisation and Climate Change since 2017, aims to reduce the volume of non-recyclable waste, encourage source separation, and significantly increase recycling rates across the country, with a target of reaching a 60% recovery rate by 2035. A key component of this national strategy is the phased implementation of a mandatory Deposit-Return System (DRS) for single-use beverage packaging (such as PET bottles, glass bottles, and aluminum cans), which began its pilot stages and is planned for nationwide rollout to enhance the collection of high-quality recyclables.

== Worldwide ==
In terms of plastic waste sorting and recycling, an estimated 9% of the estimated 6.3 billion tonnes of plastic waste from the 1950s up to 2018 has been recycled and another 12% has been incinerated with the rest reportedly being "dumped in landfills or the natural environment".

== See also ==
- Automated vacuum collection
- Curbside collection
- Materials recovery facility
- Mechanical biological treatment
- Mixed waste
- Recycling
- Reverse vending machine
- Waste collection
