= Materials recovery facility =

Plant to process recyclates

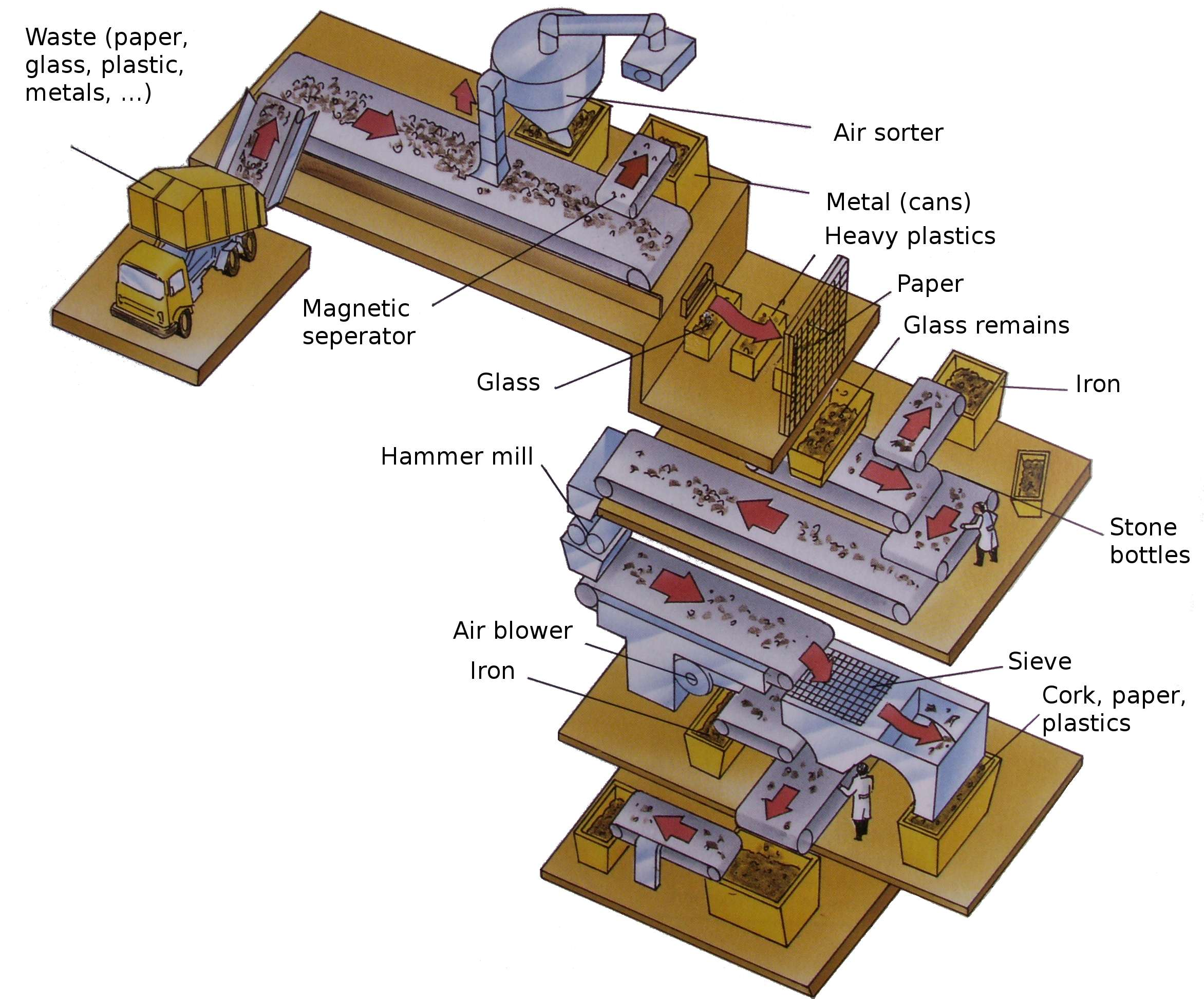
A materials recovery facility for the recycling of domestic waste

Clean materials recovery facility recycling video

A materials recovery facility, recycling center, recycling factory, materials reclamation facility, materials recycling facility or multi re-use facility (MRF, pronounced "murf") is a specialized waste sorting and recycling system that receives, separates and prepares recyclable materials for marketing to end-user manufacturers. Generally, the main recyclable materials include ferrous metal, non-ferrous metal, plastics, paper, glass. Organic food waste is used to assist anaerobic digestion or composting. Inorganic inert waste is used to make building materials. Non-recyclable high calorific value waste is used to making refuse-derived fuel (RDF) and solid recovered fuel (SRF).

== Industry and locations ==
In the United States, there are over 300 materials recovery facilities. The total market size is estimated at $6.6B as of 2019.

As of 2016, the top 75 were headed by Sims Municipal Recycling out of Brooklyn, New York. Waste Management operated 95 MRF facilities total, with 26 in the top 75. ReCommunity operated 6 in the top 75. Republic Services operated 6 in the top 75. Waste Connections operated 4 in the top 75.

== Business economics ==
In 2018, a survey in the Northeast United States found that the processing cost per ton was $82, versus a value of around $45 per ton. Composition of the ton included 28% mixed paper and 24% old corrugated containers (OCC).

Prices for OCC declined into 2019. Three paper mill companies have announced initiatives to use more recycled fiber.

Glass recycling is expensive for these facilities, but a study estimated that costs could be cut significantly by investments in improved glass processing. In Texas, Austin and Houston have facilities which have invested glass recycling, built and operated by Balcones Recycling and FCC Environment, respectively.

Robots have spread across the industry, helping with sorting.

== Process ==
Waste enters a MRF when it is dumped onto the tipping floor by the collection trucks. The materials are then scooped up and placed onto conveyor belts, which transports it to the pre-sorting area. Here, human workers remove some items that are not recyclable, which will either be sent to a landfill or an incinerator. Between 5 and 45% of "dirty" MRF material is recovered. Potential hazards are also removed, such as lithium batteries, propane tanks, and aerosol cans, which can create fires. Materials like plastic bags and hoses, which can entangle the recycling equipment, are also removed. From there, materials are transported via another conveyer belt to the disk screen, which separates wide and flat materials like flattened cardboard boxes from items like cans, jars, paper, and bottles. Flattened boxes ride across the disk screen to the other side, while all other materials fall below, where paper is separated from the waste stream with a blower. The stream of cardboard and paper is overseen by more human workers, who ensure no plastic, metal, or glass is present. Newer MRFs or retrofitted ones may use industrial robots instead of humans for pre-sorting and for quality control.

Metal is separated from plastics and glass first with electromagnets, which removes ferrous metals. Non-ferrous metals like aluminum are then removed with eddy current separators.

The glass and plastic streams are separated by further disk screens. The glass is crushed into cullet for ease of transportation. The plastics are then separated by polymer type, often using infrared technology (optical sorting). Infrared light reflects differently off different polymer types; once identified, a jet of air shoots the plastic into the appropriate bin. MRFs might only collect and recycle a few polymers of plastic, sending the rest to landfills or incinerators. The separated materials are baled and sent to the shipping dock of the facility.

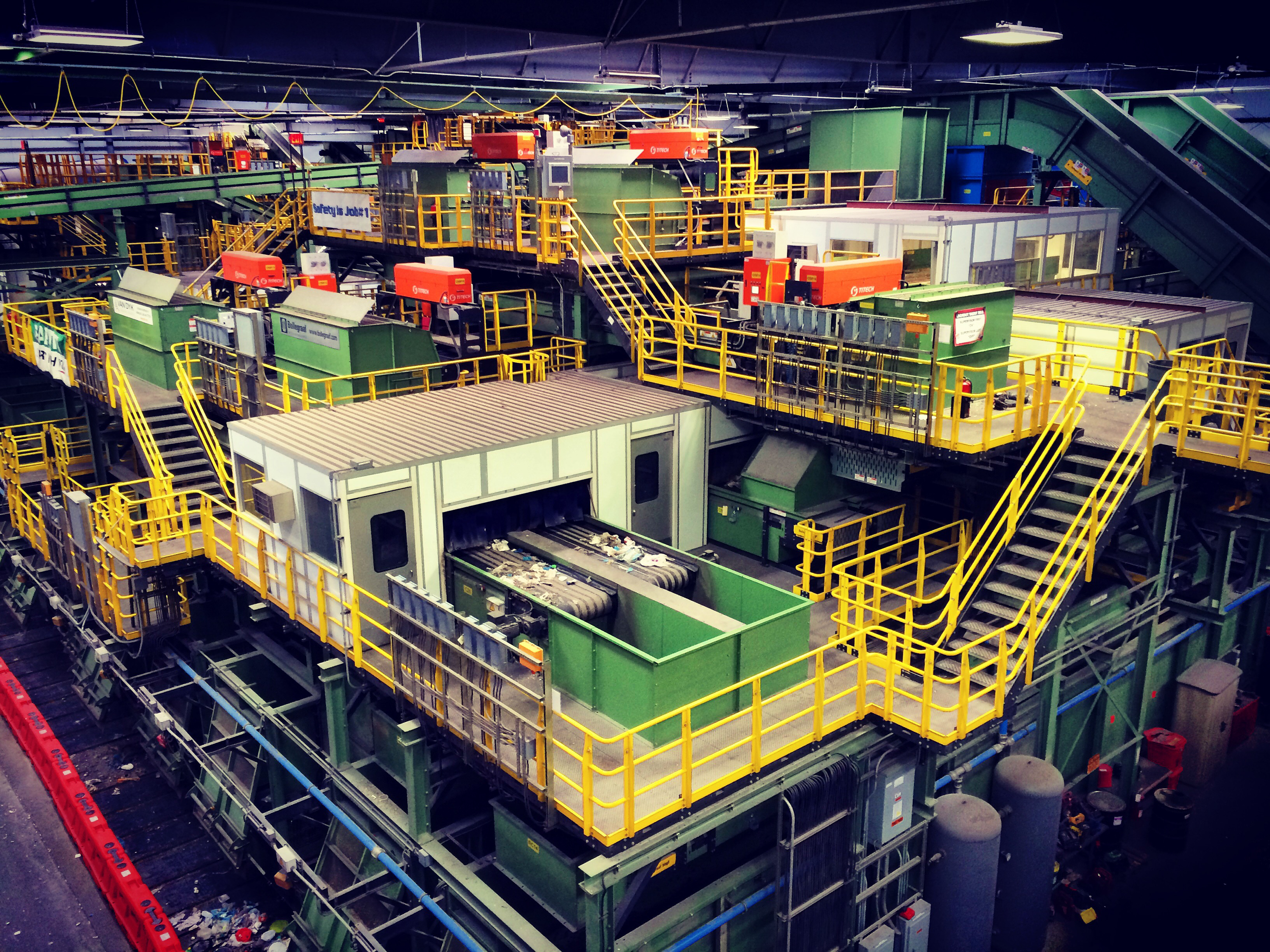
Main processing building at the Sunset Park Material Recovery Facility, Brooklyn, New York - 2015

== Types ==
=== Clean ===
A clean MRF accepts recyclable materials that have already been separated at the source from municipal solid waste generated by either residential or commercial sources. There are a variety of clean MRFs. The most common are single stream where all recyclable material is mixed, or dual stream MRFs, where source-separated recyclables are delivered in a mixed container stream (typically glass, ferrous metal, aluminum and other non-ferrous metals, PET [No.1] and HDPE [No.2] plastics) and a mixed paper stream including corrugated cardboard boxes, newspapers, magazines, office paper and junk mail. Material is sorted to specifications, then baled, shredded, crushed, compacted, or otherwise prepared for shipment to market.

=== Mixed-waste processing facility (MWPF) / Dirty MRF ===
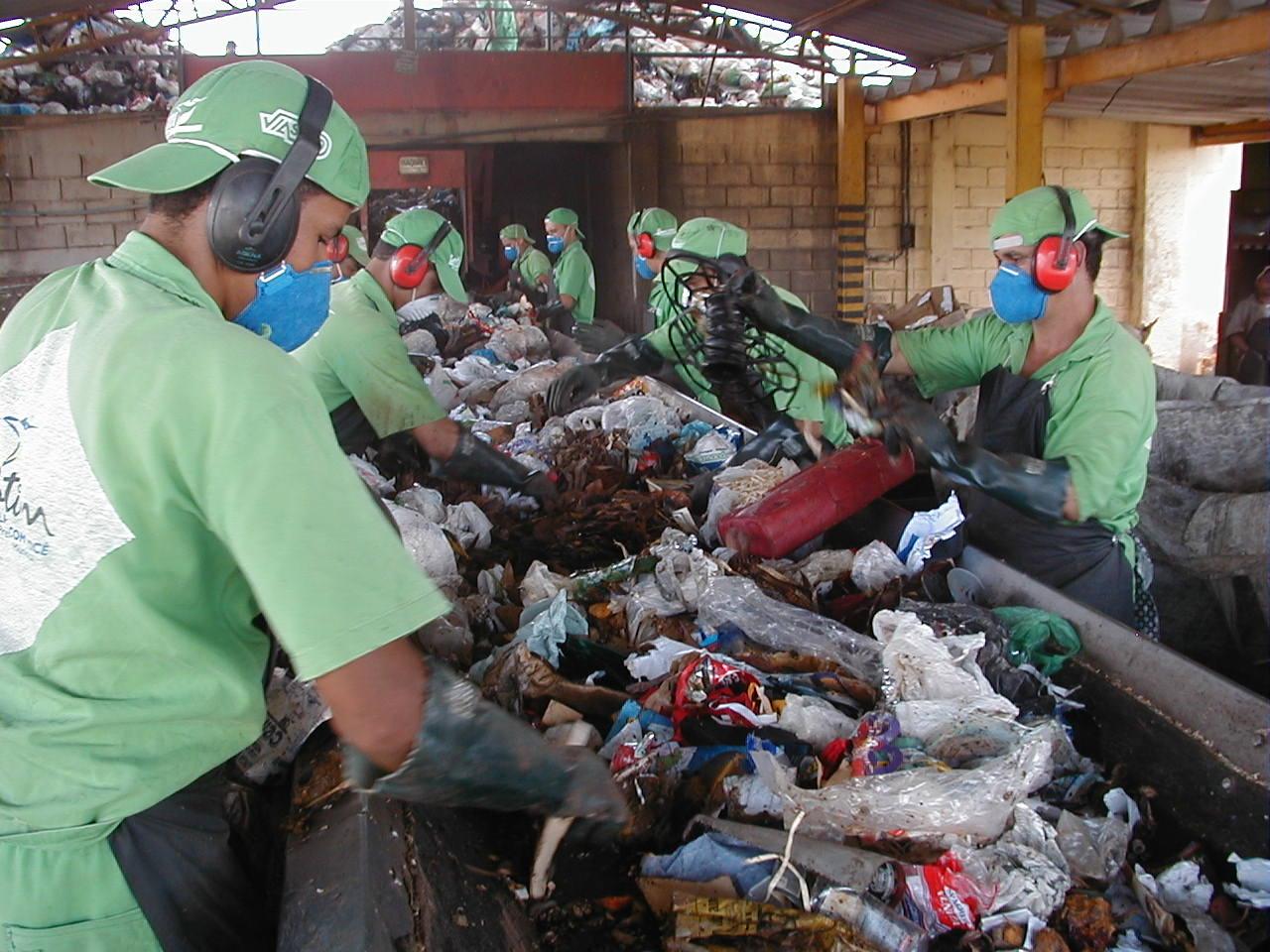
Manual material triage for recycling

A mixed-waste processing system, sometimes referred to as a dirty MRF, accepts a mixed solid waste stream and then proceeds to separate out designated recyclable materials through a combination of manual and mechanical sorting. The sorted recyclable materials may undergo further processing required to meet technical specifications established by end-markets while the balance of the mixed waste stream is sent to a disposal facility such as a landfill. Today, MWPFs are attracting renewed interest as a way to address low participation rates for source-separated recycling collection systems and prepare fuel products and/or feedstocks for conversion technologies. MWPFs can give communities the opportunity to recycle at much higher rates than has been demonstrated by curbside or other waste collection systems. Advances in technology make today’s MWPF different and, in many respects better, than older versions.

=== Wet MRF ===
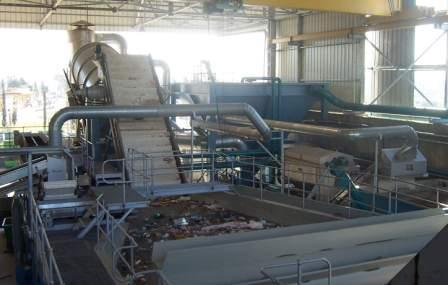
A wet materials recovery facility

Around 2004, new mechanical biological treatment technologies were beginning to utilise wet MRFs. These combine a dirty MRF with water, which acts to densify, separate and clean the output streams. It also hydrocrushes and dissolves biodegradable organics in solution to make them suitable for anaerobic digestion.

== History ==
In the United States, modern MRFs began in the 1970s. Peter Karter established Resource Recovery Systems, Inc. in Branford, Connecticut, the "first materials recovery facility (MRF)" in the US.

== See also ==
- Cradle-to-cradle design
- Curbside collection
- List of waste treatment technologies
- List of waste types
- Mechanical biological treatment
- Resource recovery
- Transfer station (waste management)
- Waste characterization
- Waste sorting
