= MHT =

The initials MHT may refer to:

- Male hose thread, usually found on garden hoses – see Garden hose#Standards and connectors
- Manchester–Boston Regional Airport, New Hampshire, US, IATA code
- Manufacturers Hanover Trust, a (former) bank now part of JPMorgan Chase
- .mht, the file extension for an MHTML file
- Marshall Islands time zone
- Masculinizing hormone therapy, a medical treatment
- Mechanical heat treatment, one of waste treatment technology
- Menopausal hormone therapy, a medical treatment
- Multiple hypothesis tracker in radar
