= Green bin =

Container for biodegradable waste or compostable materials

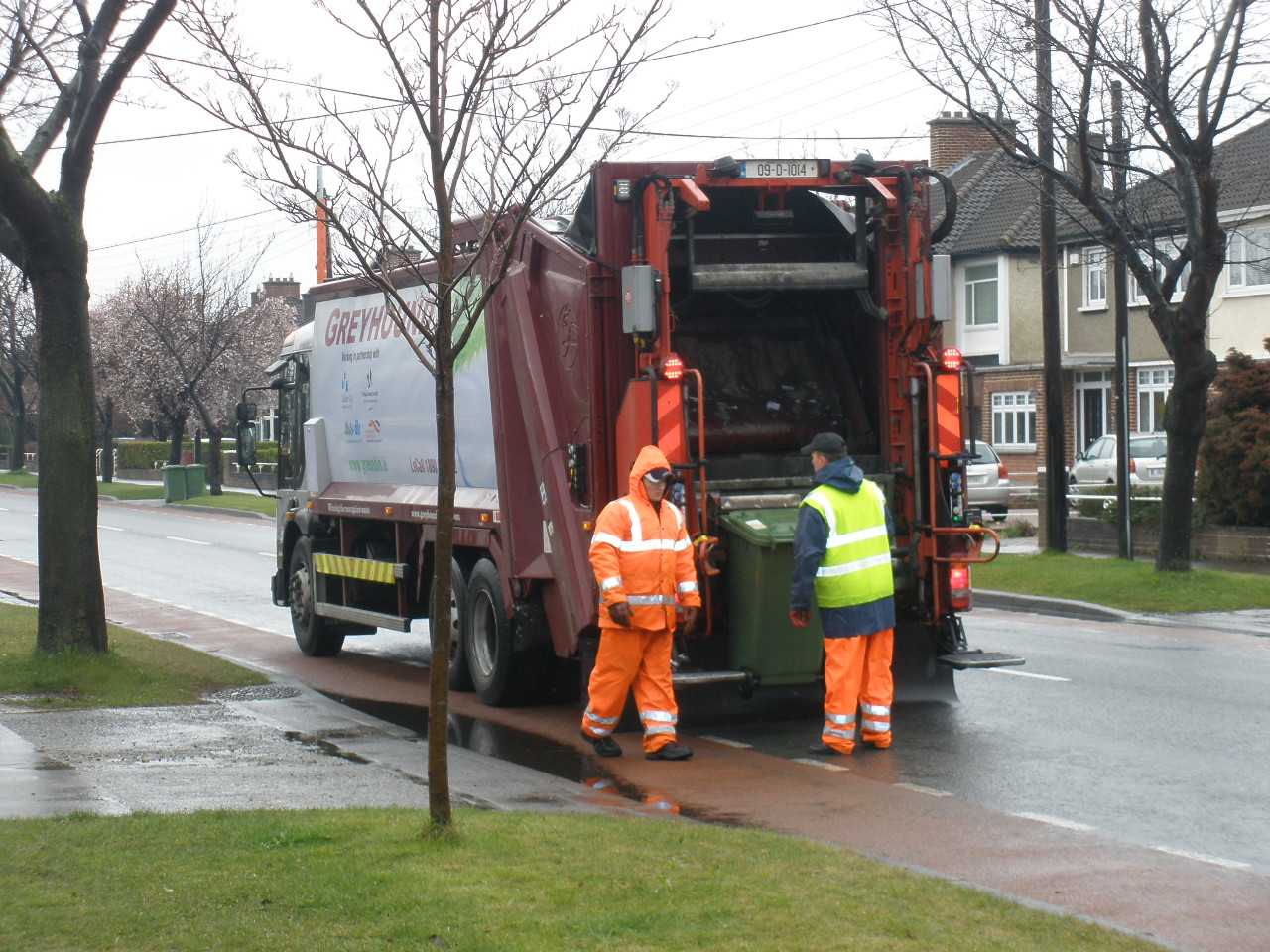
Green bins being emptied in Dublin, Ireland

A green bin is a large, movable, rigid plastic or metal waste container that contains biodegradable waste or compostable materials as a means to divert waste from landfills. In some local authorities, green bins are also used to contain unsorted municipal solid waste.

The program's purpose is to reduce the amount of waste shipped to landfills by recycling biodegradable waste into compost. The programs collect kitchen and related organic waste (typically including soiled paper products, pet waste, sawdust, and similar items) using a waist-high green curbside container, for which the programs are named. The municipality picks up the waste on a regular basis along with other garbage and recycling collections, and composts it at an industrial composting facility. While it is true that home composting can also serve this purpose, the green bin programs are viewed as being more convenient and more inclusive of source materials.

== Intended use ==
A green bin, typically designated for organic waste, plays a role in waste management and environmental sustainability. It is intended for the disposal of biodegradable materials such as food scraps, food-soiled paper, and yard waste. Suitable items include fruit and vegetable peel, coffee grounds, eggshells, yard trimmings, coffee filters, paper napkins, and small amounts of food waste. When these organic materials are properly disposed of in a green bin, they undergo composting, a natural process that transforms them into nutrient-rich compost, used to enrich soil, promote plant growth, and reduce the need for chemical fertilizers.

== Maintenance ==
Common practices help the bin remain cleaner and prevent lingering odors: keeping the container in the shade, as heat increases the smell of food waste; lining the bottom of the bin with backyard waste and paper bags, so food does not stick to the bottom and to absorb excess moisture; wrapping food with newspaper or other compostable paper; hosing down the container.

== Food waste in landfill ==
Placing items in the proper bins limits the amount of greenhouse gas emissions. When food waste sits in landfills it produces a greenhouse gas, methane. It is estimated that food waste equates "for 58% of landfill methane emissions to the atmosphere." By diverting organic waste from landfills, the environmental impact of methane gas emissions is minimized. Using green bins improves environmental health and reduces the carbon footprint associated with traditional waste disposal.

== Green bins by country ==
=== Canada ===
The following municipalities have implemented a Green Bin program:

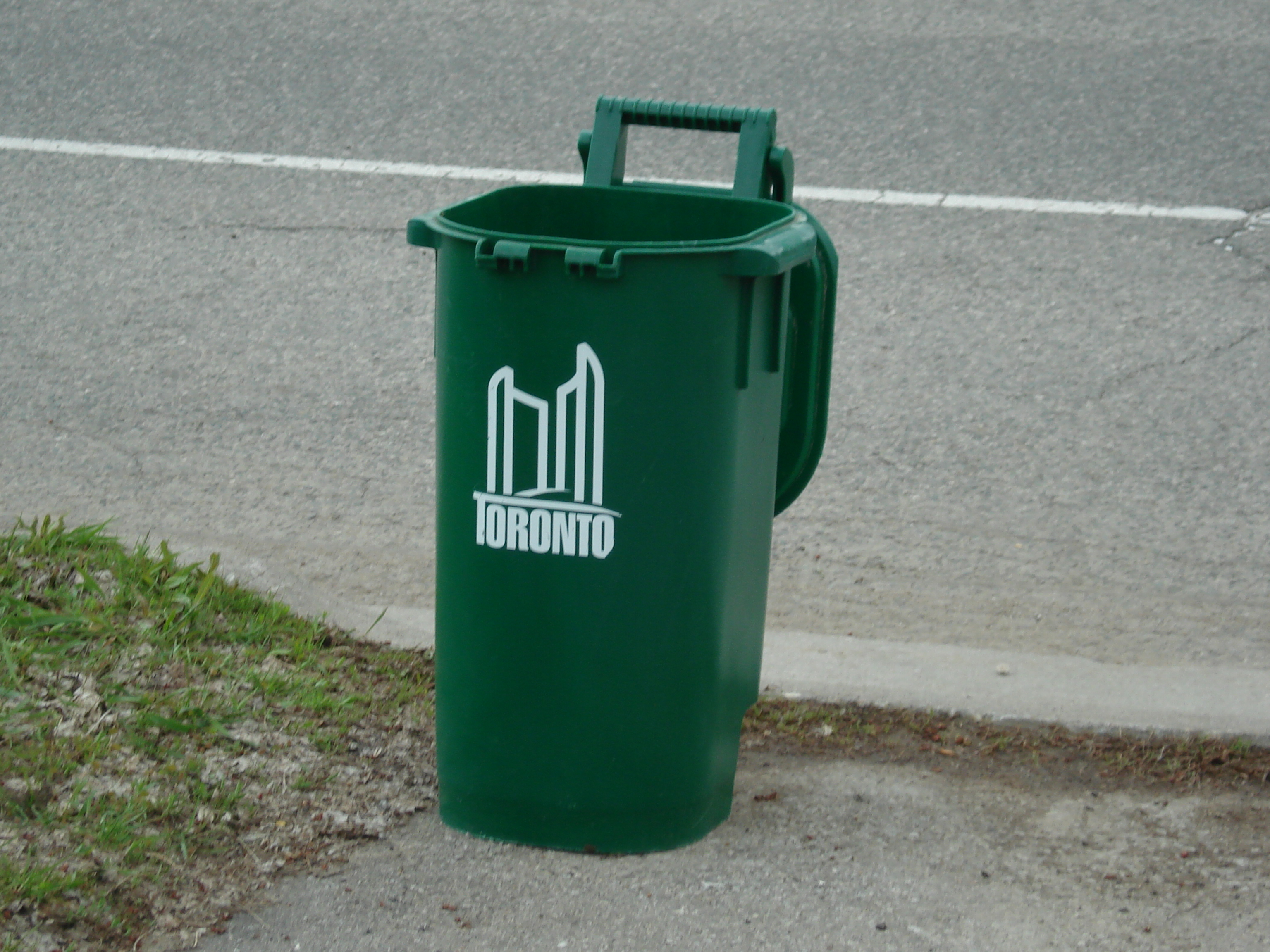
A Green Bin in Toronto, Ontario.

- Beaumont, Alberta
- Calgary, Alberta
- Coaldale, Alberta
- Dufferin County's Green Bin program has been in full operation since 2007.
- Durham Region, Ontario's Green Bin program initially began with Scugog, Uxbridge, Brock and Clarington, but has since been expanded to all municipalities in the Region since 2006.
- Edmonton, Alberta
- Fort Saskatchewan, Alberta
- Guelph, Ontario has had a "Green" compost program for several years
- The Halifax Regional Municipality has had Green Bin collection in urban areas since 1998.
- Hamilton, Ontario had originally implemented its "Green Bin" program to houses in 2006 and is the first city to recently spread the project to apartment buildings and complexes to reduce waste by 35% to ease the garbage in Hamilton's only operational landfill.
- Lethbridge, Alberta starting in 2023.
- Morinville, Alberta
- Ottawa, Ontario has a Green Bin program in operation since January 2010, with service to apartments and multi-residential units to follow.
- Peel Region, Ontario's Green Bin program began on April 2, 2007.
- Red Deer, Alberta
- Richmond, British Columbia's Green Cart program has been around since 2009 and accepts all food scraps and yard trimmings.
- Rocky Mountain House, Alberta
- Spruce Grove, Alberta
- St. Albert, Alberta
- Stony Plain, Alberta
- Strathcona County, Alberta
- Vancouver, British Columbia
- Sudbury, Ontario introduced "Green Cart" program in 2009.
- Taber, Alberta
- Toronto, Ontario began its program in the Etobicoke area in 2002, and expanded it in subsequent years until the entire city was covered in 2005.
- York Region, Ontario has implemented a Green Bin program throughout the region as of September 17, 2007. The city of Markham, the first York Region municipality to implement the program, began its Green Bin collection program as part of its "Mission Green" in the fall of 2004 with implementation to 12,500 single-family residences. "Mission Green" is Markham's plan to divert 70% of its waste from landfill. In July 2005, the program was expanded citywide.

==== Compliance ====
Green bin programs have thus far been optional for residents excluding those in Hamilton, Ontario. Many residents willingly cooperate with the programs.

- In Toronto, as of March 2006, the program was diverting 100,000 tonnes from landfill each year.
- In Markham, over 90% of residents put out green bins and blue boxes each week. Including other recycling programs, 65% of waste is being diverted from landfill.
- In Durham Region, the introduction of the Green Bin in July 2006, coupled with an increase in pickup frequency for other recyclables, has led to a 39% decrease on tonnage sent to landfill compared to July 2005.
- In Simcoe County, the introduction of the Green Bin on Sept 29th, 2008 to 16 municipalities, coupled with the weekly pickup for other recyclables, has led to a 50% diversion rate during the initial weeks of the program. This is an increase of approximately 20% over the same period last year.

In all programs, some residents perceive an increase in workload related to garbage handling, and object to the program on that basis. In Durham Region, some residents object to a requirement to use biodegradable liner bags, which adds a cost to the home-owner that does not exist in Toronto. The York Region and Toronto Green Bin programs allow residents to use regular plastic grocery sacks as liner bags.

The following mechanisms are typically used to encourage compliance:

- Garbage collection is typically performed every second week.
- The number of garbage bags allowed per collection is frequently restricted (e.g. three bags per pick up in Markham and four bags per pick-up in Durham Region).
- The use of clear garbage bags is sometimes mandated, in order to allow collection staff to determine if recyclable material is being thrown out.

=== United Kingdom ===
Green Bin recycling programmes are now common in the UK. Green Bins have been rolled out over the past 10 years to reduce the quantities of biodegradable waste contained in a black bin bag in response to the Landfill Directive. Another common colour in the UK for garden waste collection is a brown wheelie bin. Some councils collect food waste in a separate container for example, for anaerobic digestion or mixed with garden waste in the wheelie bin, where they go to an in vessel composting facility. In both cases a kitchen caddy, a 7-litre plastic box, is provided by the council, with compostable cornstarch liners and, when full, are emptied into a small kerbside box or into the garden waste bin. In Fife, Scotland, the green bin is normal sized and used to collect tins and plastics.

=== United States ===
Some US cities have begun Green Bin programs under various names, including Seattle and San Francisco.

== See also ==
- Blue box recycling system
- Blue bag - materials vary depending on the municipality
- Recycling bins - boxes with holes to allow users to drop material in to be recycled
- Composting
- Mechanical biological treatment
