= Mechanical heat treatment =

Mechanical heat treatment (MHT) is an alternative waste treatment technology. This technology is also commonly termed autoclaving. MHT involves a mechanical sorting or pre-processing stage with technology often found in a material recovery facility. The mechanical sorting stage is followed by a form of thermal treatment. This might be in the form of a waste autoclave or processing stage to produce a refuse derived fuel pellet. MHT is sometimes grouped along with mechanical biological treatment. MHT does not however include a stage of biological degradation (anaerobic digestion or composting).

== Configurations ==
Different MHT systems may be configured to meet various objectives with regard to the waste outputs from the process. The alternatives (depending on the system employed) may be one or more of the following:

- Separate an 'organic rich' component of the waste for subsequent biological processing
- Produce a refuse derived fuel to be applied in an appropriate process to utilise its energy potential; and
- Extract materials for recycling (typically glass and metals, potentially plastics and the fibrous organic and paper fraction)

== See also ==
- Anaerobic digestion
- Composting
- List of solid waste treatment technologies
- Material recovery facility
- Mechanical biological treatment
