= Biodrying =

Biodrying is the process by which biodegradable waste is rapidly heated through initial stages of composting to remove moisture from a waste stream and hence reduce its overall weight. In biodrying processes, the drying rates are augmented by biological heat in addition to forced aeration.

The major portion of biological heat, naturally available through the aerobic degradation of organic matter, is utilized to evaporate surface and bound water associated with the mixed sludge. This heat generation assists in reducing the moisture content of the biomass without the need for supplementary fossil fuels, and with minimal electricity consumption. It can take as little as 8 days to dry waste in this manner. This enables reduced costs of disposal if landfill is charged on a cost per tonne basis.

Biodrying may be used as part of the production process for refuse-derived fuels, as invented by the Italian engineer Luigi Castelli in 1987 Biodrying does not however greatly affect the biodegradability of the waste and hence is not stabilised. Biodried waste will still break down in a landfill to produce landfill gas and hence potentially contribute to climate change. In the UK this waste will still impact upon councils LATS allowances. Whilst biodrying is increasingly applied within commercial mechanical biological treatment (MBT) plants, it is also still subject to on-going research and development.

== See also ==
- List of solid waste treatment technologies
- Waste management
