= Kerbside collection =

Household waste collection service

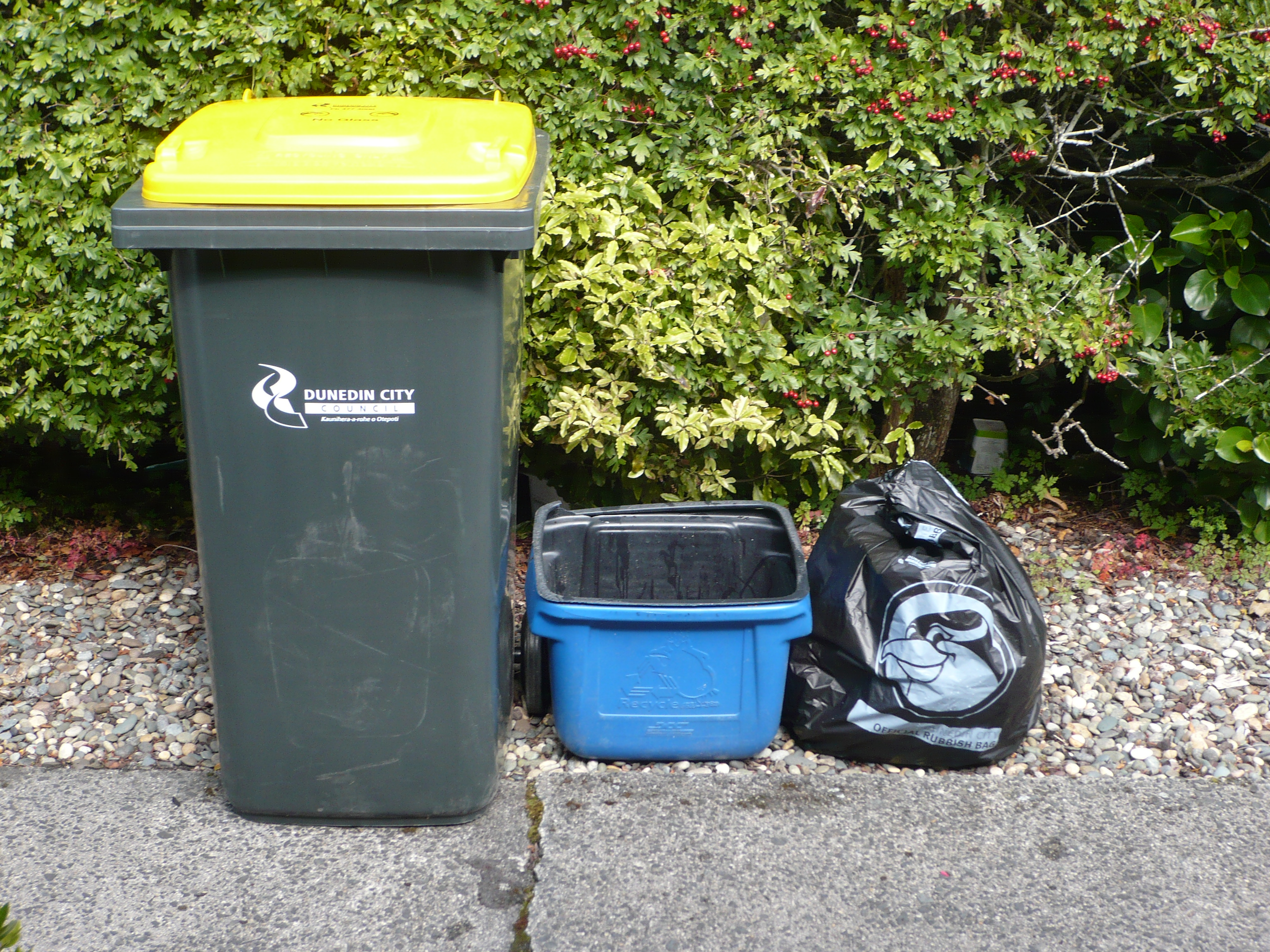
Kerbside collection bins in Dunedin, New Zealand.

Kerbside collection or curbside collection is a service provided to households, typically in urban and suburban areas, of collecting and disposing of household waste and recyclables. It is usually accomplished by personnel using specially built vehicles to pick up household waste in containers that are acceptable to, or prescribed by, the municipality and are placed on the kerb.

== History ==
Before the 20th century, the amount of waste produced by a household was relatively small. Household waste was often simply thrown out of an open window, buried in the garden or deposited in outhouses (see more at urban archaeology). When human concentrations became more dense, waste collectors, called nightmen or gong farmers were hired to collect the night soil from pail closets, performing their duties only at night (hence the name). Meanwhile, disposing of refuse became a problem wherever cities grew. Often refuse was placed in unusable areas just outside the city, such as wetlands and tidal zones. One example is London, which from Roman times disposed of its refuse outside the London Wall beside the River Thames. Another example is 1830s Manhattan, where thousands of hogs were permitted to roam the streets and eat garbage. A small industry developed as "swill children" collected kitchen refuse to sell for pig feed and the rag and bone man traded goods for bones (used for glue) and rags (essential for paper manufacture prior to the invention of wood pulping). Later, in the late nineteenth century, trash was fed to swine in industrial cities.

As sanitation engineering came to be practised beginning in the mid-19th century and human waste was conveyed from the home in pipes, the gong farmer was replaced by the municipal rubbish collector as there remained growing amounts of household refuse, including fly ash from coal, which was burnt for home heating. In Paris, the rag and bone man worked side by side with the municipal bin man, though reluctantly: in 1884, Eugène Poubelle introduced the first integrated kerbside collection and recycling system, requiring residents to separate their waste into perishable items, paper and cloth, and crockery and shells. He also established rules for how private collectors and city workers should cooperate and he developed standard dimensions for refuse containers: his name in France is now synonymous with the garbage can. Under Poubelle, food waste and other organics collected in Paris were transported to nearby Saint Ouen where they were composted. This continued well into the 20th century when plastics began to contaminate the waste stream.

From the late-19th century to the mid-20th century, more or less consistent with the rise of consumables and disposable products municipalities began to pass anti-dumping ordinances and introduce kerbside collection. Residents were required to use a variety of refuse containers to facilitate kerbside collection but the main type was a variation of Poubelle's metal garbage container. It was not until the late 1960s that the green bin bag was introduced by Glad. Later, as waste management practices were introduced with the aim of reducing landfill impacts, a range of container types, mostly made of durable plastic, came to be introduced to facilitate the proper diversion of the waste stream. Such containers include blue boxes, green bins and wheelie bins or dumpsters.

Over time, waste collection vehicles gradually increased in size from the hand pushed tip cart or English dust cart, a name by which these vehicles are still referred, to large compactor trucks.

== Waste management and resource recovery ==
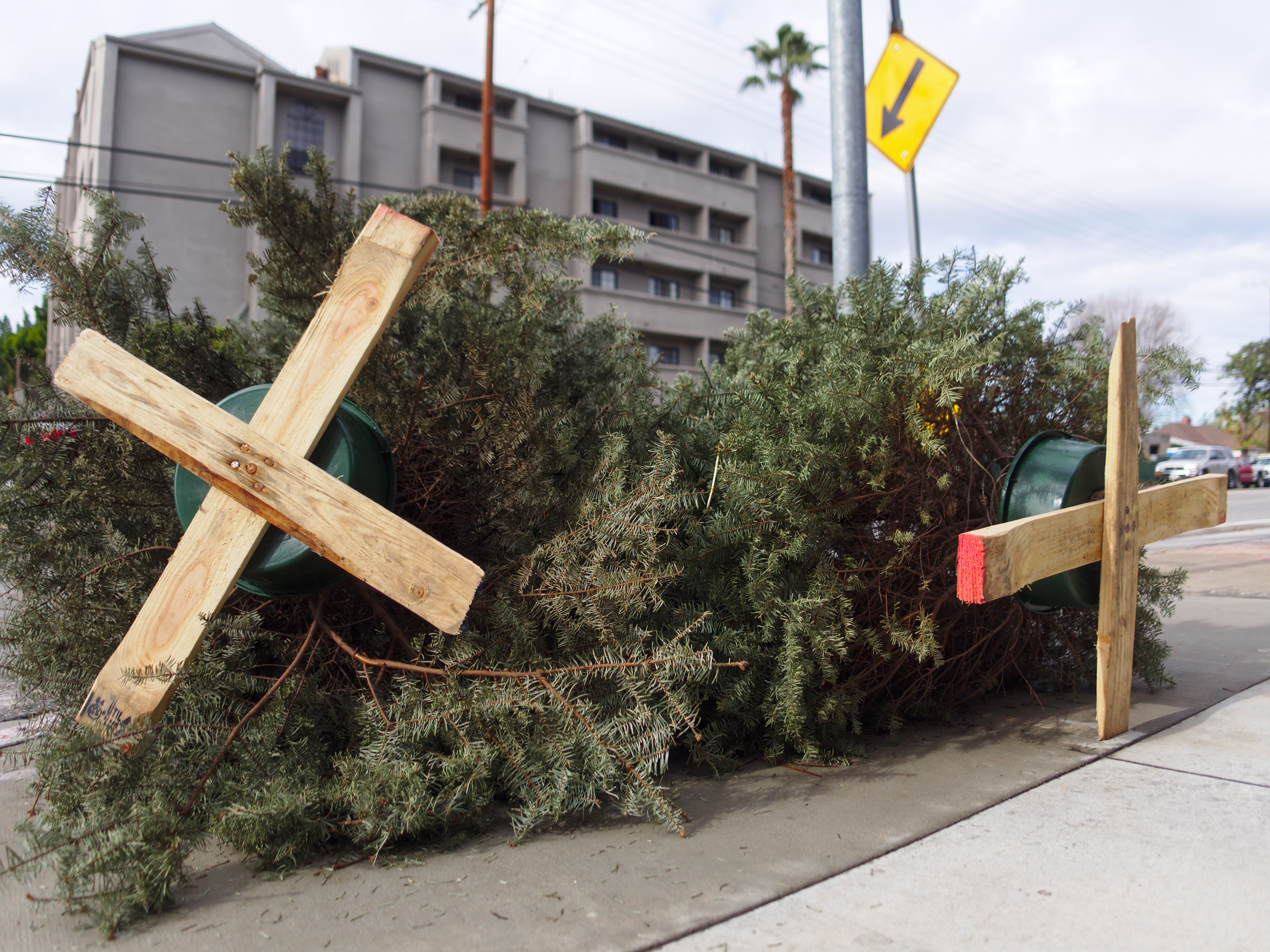
Discarded Christmas trees awaiting collection in the San Fernando Valley

Kerbside collection is today often referred to as a strategy of local authorities to collect recyclable items from the consumer. Kerbside collection is considered a low-risk strategy to reduce waste volumes and increase the recycling rates. Recyclable materials are typically collected in large wheelie bins, plastic bags, or small open, coloured plastic boxes, specifically designated for content.

Recyclable materials that may be separately collected from municipal waste include:

Biodegradable waste component

- Green waste
- Kitchen and food waste
- Christmas trees

Recyclable materials, depending on location

- Office paper
- Newsprint
- Paperboard
- Cardboard
- Corrugated fiberboard
- Plastics (#1 PET, #2 HDPE natural and coloured, #3 PVC narrow-necked containers, #4 LDPE, #5 PP, #6 Polystyrene (but not expanded polystyrene), #7 other mixed resin plastics)
- Glass
- Copper
- Aluminium
- Steel and Tinplate
- Co-mingled recyclables- can be sorted by a clean materials recovery facility

Kerbside collection of recyclable resources is aimed to recover purer waste streams with higher market value than by other collection methods. If the household residents incorrectly separate the recyclable materials, or put the wrong items in the recycling bin, the whole vehicle load of recycling will have to be rejected and sent to landfill or incineration if it is deemed to be contaminated.

Kerbside collection and household recycling schemes are also being used as tools by many local authorities to increase the public's awareness of their waste production.

New and emerging waste treatment technologies such as mechanical biological treatment may offer an alternative to kerbside collection through automated separation of waste in recycling factories.

=== Recycling variants ===
Kerbside collection encompasses many subtly different systems, which differ mostly on where in the process the recyclates are sorted and cleaned. The main categories are 1) mixed waste collection, 2) commingled recyclables, and 3) source separation. A waste collection vehicle generally picks up the waste.

System	Description	Image
Mixed waste collection	Recyclates are collected mixed with the rest of the waste, and the desired materials are sorted out and cleaned at a central sorting facility. This results in a large amount of recyclable waste (especially paper) being too soiled to reprocess, but has advantages as well: The city need not pay for the separate collection of recyclates, no public education is needed, and any changes to the recyclability of certain materials are implemented where sorting occurs.	
Co-mingled or single-stream system	Recyclables are mixed but kept separate from non-recyclable waste. This greatly reduces the need for post-collection cleaning, but requires public education on what materials are recyclable.	
Source separation	Each material is cleaned and sorted by the consumer prior to collection. It requires the least post-collection sorting and produces the purest recyclates. However, it incurs additional operating costs for collecting each material, and requires extensive public education to avoid recyclate contamination. In Oregon, US, Oregon DEQ surveyed multi-family property managers; about half of them reported problems, including contamination of recyclables due to trespassers such as transients gaining access to collection areas.	

Source separation used to be the preferred method due to the high cost of sorting commingled (mixed waste) collection. However, advances in sorting technology have substantially lowered this overhead, and many areas that had developed source separation programs have switched to what is called co-mingled collection.

== Usage by country ==
=== Australia ===
Residential kerbside collection is carried out by local governments, with some exceptions, e.g. some large apartment complexes may have their own separate arrangements with commercial providers. Available services and details vary from council to council. Councils generally provide residents with wheelie bins for kerbside collection of normal waste which is collected weekly or fortnightly. Many councils also have less frequent kerbside collection of bulkier waste ("hard rubbish") collected once or twice a year.

Councils provide their residents with two or three wheelie bins, depending on the council, with some councils having different options for different properties. The two-bin system consists of a recycling bin (usually 240 litre) for co-mingled recyclables, and a general waste bin which is often smaller (e.g. 140 litre, 120 litre or 80 litre). The three-bin system consists of the above two bins plus a green waste bin (usually 240 litre). Not all councils have a green waste bin collection service. Many councils provide the option of larger bins, smaller bins, or additional bins.

A wide variety of hard plastics, glass bottles and jars, steel cans, aluminium cans, paper and cardboard can be put in the recycling bin. The green waste bin can be used for garden organics (e.g. small branches, leaves, grass clippings), and councils are increasingly allowing food scraps, used paper towels and tissues and other biodegradable organics to be placed in the green waste bin. The council may turn the green waste into mulch (garden waste collection only) or compost and extract energy (food organics and garden organics). Details of what can and cannot be placed into each bin vary by council.

Most councils follow a standard colour scheme for their wheelie bins, specified in Australian standard AS4123. According to the standard, general waste bins have a red lid, recycling bins have a yellow lid, green waste bins have a lime green lid, and all these bins have a dark green or black body. Not all councils follow this colour scheme. For example, recycling bins in some councils have a blue body and yellow lid.

Bins are emptied according to one of several patterns. Generally speaking, general waste bins are emptied weekly while recycling bins and green waste bins are emptied fortnightly on alternate weeks. Many councils with food waste recycling have switched to emptying green waste bins weekly and general waste bins and recycling bins fortnightly on alternate weeks. Some councils empty recycling bins weekly, while others do so only during a certain period like the Christmas and summer holiday period, switching to fortnightly at other times.

Recycling bins are provided at no additional cost, while the general waste bin is either at no additional cost or at an annual cost. The green waste bin, where available, is either provided to all residents, or available as an option to residents, either at an additional annual cost, a one-off cost or no additional cost, depending on the council. Some councils limit the availability of green waste bins (e.g. the City of Cockburn limits them to properties over a certain land size). Many councils provide the option of larger bins than the standard ones provided (even larger than 240 litres in some cases) or additional bins at additional annual cost. Some provide the option of a smaller general waste bin at a reduced cost.

Many councils also have kerbside collection of bulky waste. There may be different kinds of collection, e.g.:

- Large branches
- E-waste (e.g. TVs, computers) which the council may recycle
- Hard rubbish (anything else too big or too heavy for the wheelie bin)

For bulky waste, residents are asked to place items directly on the kerbside. There may be other rules, e.g. what can and cannot be collected, limits on the amount of rubbish that will be collected, etc. that vary from council to council. Collections may occur once or a few times a year on specific dates or date ranges, or on demand with a limit to the number of times per year, depending on the council.

=== Austria ===
Kerbside collection is universal in Austria. The service is provided by the municipality. A fee applies for non-recyclable general waste, while recyclables are collected for free, being mainly financed by companies selling packaged goods via a mandatory fee. Different waste containers are used for general waste (black), paper (red), plastics (yellow), organic waste (green or brown), metal (blue) and glass (white for clear glass, green for coloured glass). In some rural areas, appropriately coloured plastic bags are used instead of bins. In many areas, a collection service for Christmas trees is provided in early January.

=== Canada ===
Halifax Regional Municipality (HRM) in Nova Scotia, Canada, with a population of about 375,000, has one of the most complex kerbside collection programmes in North America. Based on the green cart, it requires residents to self-sort refuse and place different types at the kerb on alternating weeks. As shown in the photo at left, week 1 would see the green cart and optional orange bags used for kitchen waste and other organics such as yard waste. Week 2 would permit non-recoverable waste in garbage bags or cans. Blue bags are used for paper, plastic and metal containers. Together with used grocery bags containing newspapers, they may be placed on the kerb either week. In summer, the green cart is emptied weekly due to the prevalence of flies. HRM has achieved a diversion rate of approximately 60 percent by this method.

Calgary, Alberta has adopted "Curbside" Recycling and uses blue bins. The blue cart programme accepts all types of recyclables, including plastics 1–7. It is picked up weekly for the cost of $8.00 per month. This programme is mandatory.

In 1981 Resource Integration Systems (RIS) in collaboration with Laidlaw International tested the first blue box recycling system on 1500 homes in Kitchener, Ontario. Due to the success of the project the City of Kitchener put out a contract for public bid in 1984 for a recycling system citywide. Laidlaw won the bid and continued with the popular blue box recycling system. Today hundreds of cities around the world use the blue box system or a similar variation.

Many Canadian municipalities use "green bins" for curbside recycling. Others, such as Moncton, use wet/dry waste separation and recovery programmes.

=== New Zealand ===
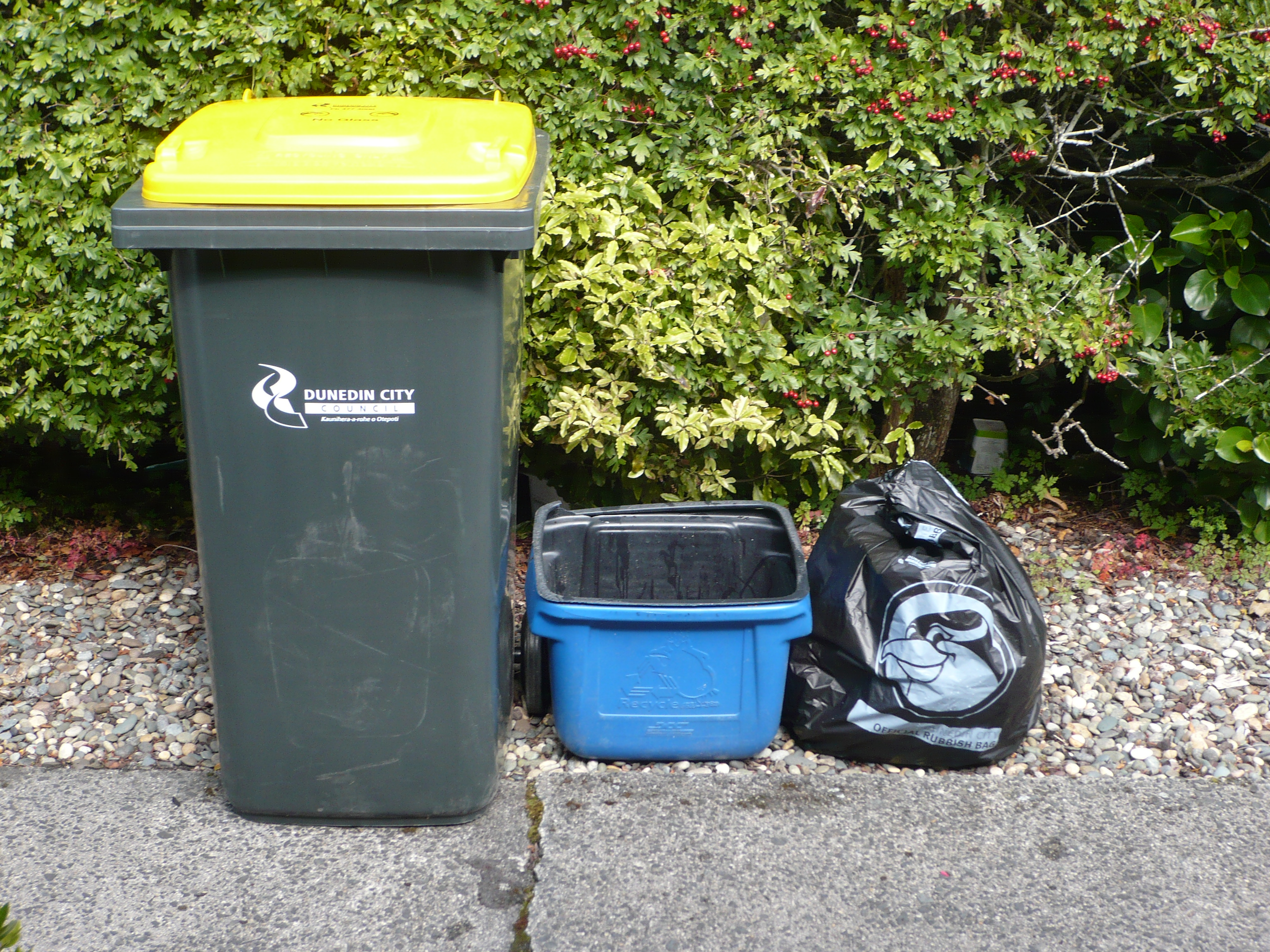
Kerbside collection bins in Dunedin, New Zealand. The yellow-liddied wheelie bin is for non-glass recyclables, and the blue bin is for glass. The two bins are collected on alternating weeks. Official council bags are used for general household waste, and are collected weekly.

In New Zealand, kerbside collection of general refuse and recycling, and in some areas organic waste, is the responsibility of the local city or district council, or private contractors. Practices and collection methods vary widely from council to council and company to company. Some examples of collection are:

- Auckland Council: Two 240-litre wheelie bins are supplied: a red-lidded bin for general refuse, collected weekly, and a blue-lidded bin for recyclables, collected fortnightly.
- Christchurch City Council: Three wheelie bins are supplied: a 140-litre red-lidded bin for general refuse, a 240-litre yellow-lidded bin for recyclables, and an 80-litre green-lidded bin for organic waste. The organic waste bins are collected weekly, while the recyclables and general refuse bins are collected on alternating weeks.
- Hamilton City Council and Hutt City Council: A 45-litre bin is supplies for recyclables, collected weekly. General refuse is collected weekly using user-pays official council bags.
- Dunedin City Council, Palmerston North City Council and Wellington City Council: Two bins are supplied: a 45-litre or 70-litre bin for glass, and an 80-litre or 240-litre wheelie bin for non-glass recyclables. These two bins are collected on alternating weeks. General refuse is collected weekly using user-pays official council bags.
- Rodney District Council: A 45-litre bin is supplies for recyclables, collected weekly. There is no council collection of general waste, and all general waste collection is carried out by independent companies.
- Taupō District Council: A 45-litre bin is supplies for recyclables, collected weekly. General refuse is collected weekly using user-pays system of orange tags - one orange tag is to be placed on a standard rubbish bag up to 60 litres capacity, or half an orange sticker can be placed on two supermarket bags tied together.
- Upper Hutt City Council: Recycling is to be placed in plastic bags, with paper and cardboard collected in the first week, and plastic, metal and glass in the second week. General refuse is collected weekly using user-pays official council bags.
- Waitakere City Council: A 140-litre wheelie bin is provided for recyclables, collected fortnightly. General refuse is collected weekly using user-pays official council bags.

By 1996 the New Zealand cities of Auckland, Waitakere, North Shore and Lower Hutt had kerbside recycling bins available. In New Plymouth, Wanganui and Upper Hutt recyclable material was collected if placed in suitable bags. By 2007 73% of New Zealanders had access to kerbside recycling.

Kerbside collection of organic waste is carried out by the Mackenzie District Council and the Timaru District Council. Christchurch City Council is introducing the system to their kerbside collection. Other councils are carrying out trials.

=== United Kingdom ===
In the United Kingdom, the Household Waste Recycling Act 2003 requires local authorities to provide every household with a separate collection of at least two types of recyclable materials by 2010. There has been criticism in the difference of schemes used in the country such as the colour of bins, whether the recycling is collected from wheelie bins, coloured plastic boxes or plastic bags, and also the fact that the bins, boxes and bags obstruct the roads and pavements, and how the additional collection vehicles and waste collection services needed also contribute to traffic congestion and produce carbon dioxide emissions. Some find the colour differences confusing, and some people want a national scheme. A typical example is to compare two neighbouring councils in Greater Manchester; Bury Council and Salford City Council. Bury uses blue for cans, plastic and glass, green for paper and cardboard and brown for garden waste. Salford uses blue for paper and card, brown for cans, plastic and glass, and pink for garden waste. Most councils use grey or black bins for general waste, with a few exceptions such as Liverpool, which uses a purple bin for general waste, a colour that is used by no other council.

Another controversial issue in the UK is the frequency of the waste collections. To save money, many councils are reducing the frequency of both general waste and recycling collections. This has caused problems from larger households, and has led to an increase of overflowing bins and fly tipping. For example, previously, Bury Council collected general waste once a week and recyclables fortnightly. This has now changed to fortnightly for general waste and monthly (every 4 weeks) collection of recyclables.

A few councils are using "forced" recycling, by replacing the large, 240 litre general waste bin with a smaller 180 litre or 140 litre bin, and using the old 240 litre one for recyclables. This may be made worse by fortnightly collections of the "small" bin, and strict rules such as "No extra waste will be collected" and "Bin lids must be fully closed". Stockport Council is a notable user of this scheme. Their recycling rates have substantially increased as a result, but there are usually complaints from household residents. Trafford Council also use a similar scheme, but the small grey bin is emptied every week. In addition, the two named councils, and more, collect food waste together with garden waste, by sending out kitchen caddies and compostable bin liners. These prevent food waste (including meat and fish) from going to landfill or incineration, and to increase the council's recycling rate. The food and garden waste is usually collected weekly or fortnightly, and is taken to an in-vessel composting facility or an anaerobic digestion plant, where the biodegradable waste is organically recycled into soil fertiliser to be used on local farms.

In North West England, all the glass collected for recycling is used within the UK, around half of the plastics and cans are used in the UK; the rest is sent further afield to continental Europe or China to be made into new products, and paper and cardboard collected is sent to local paper mills to be reprocessed into newspapers, tissues and paper towels, cardboard and office paper. Once again, some of the paper will be sent further afield.

Some councils only use three bins, i.e. general waste, food and garden waste and mixed recyclables. This means that a single-stream recycling system is used, so plastics, cans and glass go into the same bin as paper and cardboard. Although this is much easier for the residents, there is more sorting required, and the paper quality is sometimes of a low grade due to food waste or liquid contamination or shards of glass in the paper, and so this scheme has been criticised.

Also, most councils require residents to remove all plastic caps and lids from plastic bottles, and thoroughly rinse them out to avoid unpleasant smells or liquid contamination. This is because the caps and lids are made from a different type of plastic (PP) from the bottle (PET/HDPE); if the bottles are squashed down and folded over like toothpaste tubes and caps are screwed back on, the size and volume of bottles is greatly reduced, so that more bottles can be contained inside the recycling bins. In fact many bottlers, especially bottled water companies, have now designed their bottles to be collapsible; though this message has not been effectively disseminated to the consumer. A collapsible bottle takes between 25% and 33% of the space a non-collapsed bottle.

Labels and neck rings can, however, be left on the bottles and they do not need to be removed. This also means that only plastic bottles can be recycled. Many councils are still trying to remind residents that plastic pots, tubs and trays (yoghurts, desserts and spreads), plastic carrier bags, crisp packets and cling film cannot be recycled via the kerbside economically. If too many incorrect, unsuitable or unsafe materials are put into the recycling bin, this means that the whole vehicle load of recycling will have to be rejected and sent directly to landfill or incineration at a high cost. Contamination is normally a problem if recyclables are collected from wheelie bins, as the bin collection workers can only look at the top; there may be a small amount of contamination 'hidden' at the bottom. Councils that use many bags and boxes (Edinburgh) suffer from less contamination but are complicated and the loose paper and cardboard, and plastic recycling bags are blown around by the wind, and paper can become wet due to rain or snow, or contaminated with food residue, dirt, oil or grease.

=== Spain ===
==== Basque Country ====
In the province of Gipuzkoa, this system is implanted in many towns as Usurbil, Hernani, Oiartzun, Antzuola, Legorreta, Itsasondo, Zaldibia, Anoeta, Alegia, Irura, Zizurkil, Astigarraga, Ordizia, Oñati and Lezo, where the common used name in Basque is "atez-atekoa", which means door-by-door. Due to the big success in these towns, with more than 80% of the waste recycled, 34 towns in Gipuzkoa are considering setting this system up in 2013, like Arrasate, Bergara, Aretxabaleta, Eskoriatza, Legazpi, Tolosa or Pasaia.

The "atez-ate" system consists in hanging each kind of rubbish in a hanger outside the house a certain day or days in a week. For example, in Hernani, they have three days to hang their organic rubbish, two days for plastics and metallics, one for paper and one for rejects residuals.

This system started in the town of Usurbil in the year 2009, due to the incinerator of the region of Gipuzkoa which was going to be built in this town, exactly in the neighborhood of Zubieta. Three years after, the construction of the incinerator was stopped by the government of the region, suggesting that the incinerator was a source of contamination and the high cost of the building.

== Criticism ==
This type of collection service is subject to criticism:

- The large (wheelie bin) container encourages the "out of sight" rubbish mentality and invites more rubbish to be disposed of.
- The bins and collection trucks are not suited to narrow roads or houses with steep driveways or steps.
- They lock local authorities into capital intensive equipment programmes and multi-national providers.
- Co-mingled recyclables are sometimes not being successfully managed by automated sorting stations and the rates of diversion are low. In some cases, this results in mountains of unsorted recyclables.
- In the UK especially, some councils are sending out at least 4 large bins - residents of smaller houses with no gardens have little space to put them; not everybody lives in a house, some live in blocks of apartments
- Many use small plastic boxes, bags and lockable outdoor food waste 'caddies' which get blown around and lost, bad for recycling participation.

== See also ==
- History of waste management
- Materials recovery facility
- Mechanical biological treatment
- Recycling
- Composting
- Waste management
