= List of solid waste treatment technologies =

The article contains a list of different forms of solid waste treatment technologies and facilities employed in waste management infrastructure.

== Waste handling facilities ==
- Civic amenity site (CA site)
- Transfer station

== Established waste treatment technologies ==
- Incineration
- Landfill
- Recycling
- Specific to organic waste:
  - Anaerobic digestion
  - Composting
    - Windrow composting

== Alternative waste treatment technologies ==
In the UK some of these are sometimes termed advanced waste treatment technologies

- Biodrying
- Gasification
  - Plasma gasification: Gasification assisted by plasma torches
- Hydrothermal carbonization
- Hydrothermal liquefaction
- Mechanical biological treatment (sorting into selected fractions)
  - Refuse-derived fuel
- Mechanical heat treatment
- Molten salt oxidation
- Pyrolysis
- UASB (applied to solid wastes)
- Waste autoclave
- Specific to organic waste:
  - Bioconversion of biomass to mixed alcohol fuels
  - In-vessel composting
  - Landfarming
  - Sewage treatment
  - Tunnel composting

== See also ==
- Bioethanol
- Biodiesel
- List of waste management companies
- List of wastewater treatment technologies
- Pollution control
- Waste-to-energy
- Burn pit
