= Waste treatment =

Waste management strategy

Waste treatment refers to the activities required to ensure that waste has the least practicable impact on the environment. In many countries various forms of waste treatment are required by law. There are different categories of waste treatment such as solid, water, and radioactive waste treatment. These come from different practices such as agriculture, factories, and sewage. Within wastewater treatment there are different subcategories. These include agricultural, industrial, and sewage.

== Solid waste treatment ==
The treatment of solid wastes is a key component of waste management. Different forms of solid waste treatment are graded in the waste hierarchy. The difference in waste management and waste treatment comes in the timing of them. Waste management is more focused on the approach of limiting waste initially and finding use for it. Waste treatment is more focused on the end of the waste's life. A common method of solid waste treatment is using landfills. Landfills are natural or manmade pits where waste is stored. The areas used for landfills are carefully selected far from habitats to keep the waste from damaging them. Another common practice of solid waste treatment is composting. Composting is a natural form of recycling decomposed waste. Composting can enrich soils and be very beneficial for agriculture.

== Wastewater treatment ==
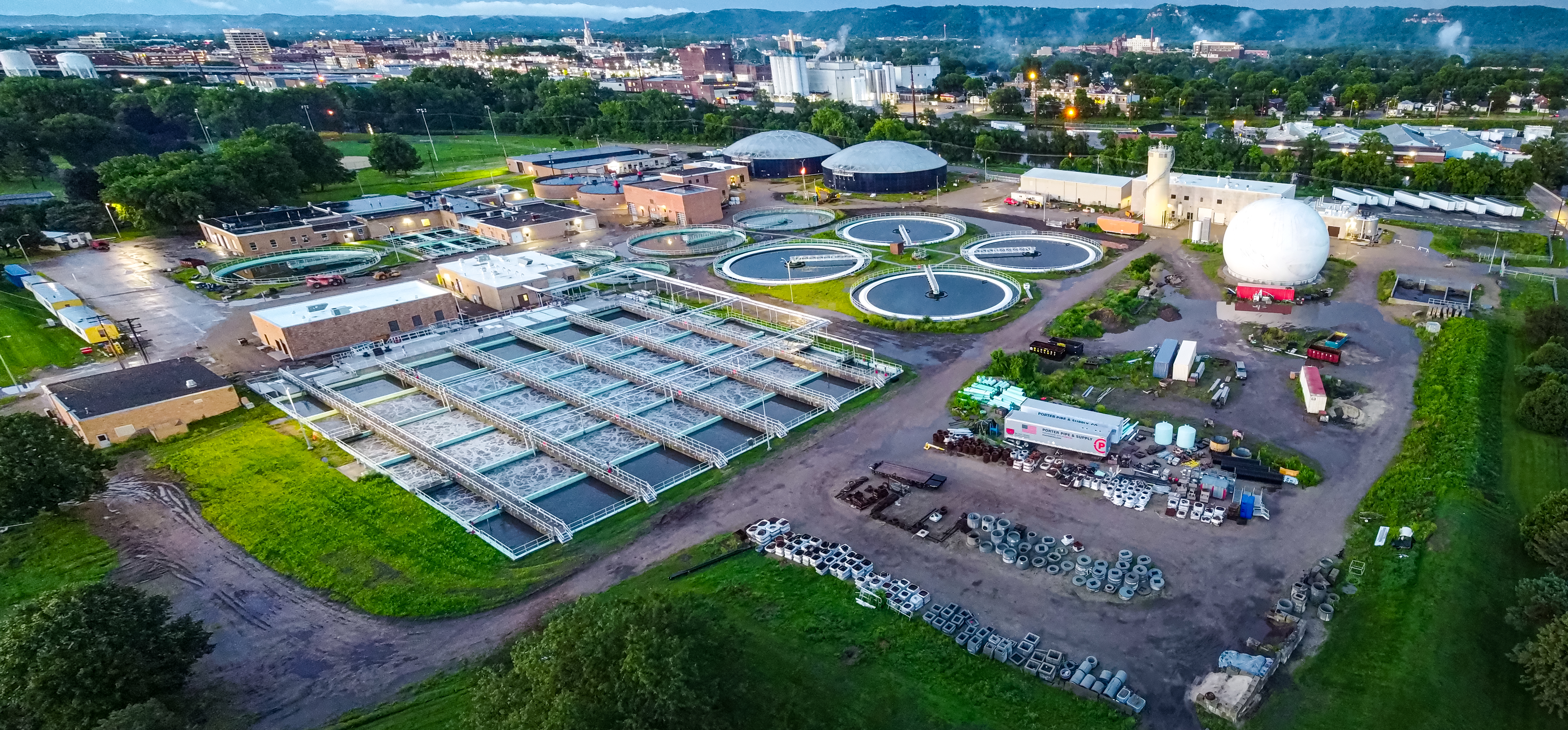
Wastewater treatment facility in La Crosse

=== Agricultural wastewater treatment ===
Agricultural wastewater treatment is treatment and disposal of liquid animal waste, pesticide residues etc. from agriculture. Concentrated animal feeding operations (CAFOs) are a large contributor to water contamination with animal waste. A possible treatment to contaminated agricultural wastewater is extending rainwater drainage systems. Extending these systems allows room for water cleaning and collecting systems to be implemented. Another solution is reusing already treated wastewater from treatment plants. This diminishes any risk of the water being contaminated.

=== Industrial wastewater treatment ===
Industrial wastewater is contaminated water from industrial practices. This water can contain harmful materials like chemicals, metals, and bacteria. Industrial wastewater treatment is the treatment of this water from factories, mines, power plants and other commercial facilities. Because 80% of the wastewater from industrial practices goes back into different ecosystems without being treated, it is harmful to many different animals and their habitats.

=== Sewage treatment ===
Sewage treatment is the treatment and disposal of human waste. Sewage is produced by all human communities. Treatment in urbanized areas is typically handled by centralized treatment systems. Alternative systems may use composting processes or processes that separate solid materials by settlement and then convert soluble contaminants into biological sludge and into gases such as carbon dioxide or methane.

== Radioactive waste treatment ==
Radioactive waste treatment is the treatment and containment of radioactive waste.
