= Refuse-derived fuel =

Extracted combustible fraction of municipal and other solid waste

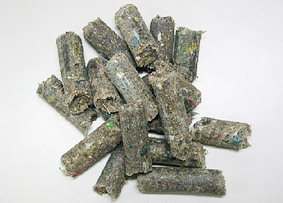
Refuse-derived fuel pellets

Refuse-derived fuel (RDF) is a fuel produced from various types of waste such as municipal solid waste (MSW), industrial waste or commercial waste.

The World Business Council for Sustainable Development provides a definition:

"Selected waste and by-products with recoverable calorific value can be used as fuels in a cement kiln, replacing a portion of conventional fossil fuels, like coal, if they meet strict specifications. Sometimes they can only be used after pre-processing to provide ‘tailor-made’ fuels for the cement process".

RDF consists largely of combustible components of such waste, as non recyclable plastics (not including PVC), paper cardboard, labels, and other corrugated materials. These fractions are separated by different processing steps, such as screening, air classification, ballistic separation, separation of ferrous and non ferrous materials, glass, stones and other foreign materials and shredding into a uniform grain size, or also pelletized in order to produce a homogeneous material which can be used as substitute for fossil fuels in e.g. cement plants, lime plants, coal-fired power plants or as reduction agent in steel furnaces. If documented according to CEN/TC 343 it can be labeled as solid recovered fuels (SRF).

Others describe the properties, such as:

- Secondary fuels
- Substitute fuels
- “AF“ as an abbreviation for alternative fuels
- Ultimately most of the designations are only general paraphrases for alternative fuels which are either waste-derived or biomass-derived.

There is no universal exact classification or specification which is used for such materials. Even legislative authorities have not yet established any exact guidelines on the type and composition of alternative fuels. The first approaches towards classification or specification are to be found in Germany (Bundesgütegemeinschaft für Sekundärbrennstoffe) as well as at European level (European Recovered Fuel Organisation). These approaches which are initiated primarily by the producers of alternative fuels, follow a correct approach: Only through an exactly defined standardisation in the composition of such materials can both production and utilisation be uniform worldwide.

First approaches towards alternative fuel classification:

Solid recovered fuels are part of RDF in the fact that it is produced to reach a standard such as CEN/343 ANAS. A comprehensive review is now available on SRF / RDF production, quality standards and thermal recovery, including statistics on European SRF quality.

== History ==
In the 1950s tyres were used for the first time as refuse derived fuel in the cement industry. Continuous use of various waste-derived alternative fuels then followed in the mid-1980s with “Brennstoff aus Müll“ (BRAM) – fuel from waste – in the Westphalian cement industry in Germany.

At that time the thought of cost reduction through replacement of fossil fuels was the priority as considerable competition pressure weighed down on the industry. Since the eighties the German Cement Works Association (Verein Deutscher Zementwerke e.V. (VDZ, Düsseldorf)) has been documenting the use of alternative fuels in the federal German cement industry. In 1987 less than 5% of fossil fuels were replaced by refuse derived fuels, in 2015 its use increased to almost 62%.

Refuse-derived fuels are used in a wide range of specialized waste to energy facilities, which are using processed refuse-derived fuels with lower calorific values of 8-14MJ/kg in grain sizes of up to 500 mm to produce electricity and thermal energy (heat/steam) for district heating systems or industrial uses.

== Processing ==
Materials such as glass and metals are removed during the treatment processing since they are non-combustible. The metal is removed using a magnet and the glass using mechanical screening. After that, an air knife is used to separate the light materials from the heavy ones. The light materials have higher calorific value and they create the final RDF. The heavy materials will usually continue to a landfill. The residual material can be sold in its processed form (depending on the process treatment) as a plain mixture or it may be compressed into pellet fuel, bricks or logs and used for other purposes either stand-alone or in a recursive recycling process. RDF or SRF is the combustible sub-fraction of municipal solid waste and other similar solid waste, produced using a mix of mechanical and/or biological treatment methods such as biodrying. in mechanical-biological treatment (MBT) plants. During the production of RDF / SRF in MBT plants there are solid loses of otherwise combustible material, which generates a debate whether the production and use of RDF / SRF is resource efficient or not over traditional one-step combustion of residual MSW in incineration (Energy from waste) plants.

In the process of making RDF pellets from shredded SRF, drying is often required. Typically, the moisture content needs to be reduced to below 20% to produce high-calorific, high-density RDF pellets. Drying RDF often requires a substantial amount of energy, so choosing an inexpensive heat source is preferable.

The production of RDF may involve the following steps:

- Bag splitting/Shredding
- Manual sorting (typically to remove inerts, PVC and/or other unwanted objects)
- Size screening
- Magnetic separation
- Eddy current separation (non-magnetic metals)
- Air classifier (density separation)
- Coarse shredding
- Refining separation by infrared separation
- Drying
- Pelletizing
- Mixing/homogenization

== End markets ==
RDF can be used in a variety of ways to produce electricity or as a replacement of fossil fuels. It can be used alongside traditional sources of fuel in coal power plants. In Europe RDF can be used in the cement kiln industry, where strict air pollution control standards of the Waste Incineration Directive apply. The main limiting factor for RDF / SRF use in cement kilns is its total chlorine (Cl) content, with mean Cl content in average commercially manufactured SRF being at 0.76 w/w on a dry basis (± 0.14% w/wd, 95% confidence). RDF can also be fed into plasma arc gasification modules & pyrolysis plants. Where the RDF is capable of being combusted cleanly or in compliance with the Kyoto Protocol, RDF can provide a funding source where unused carbon credits are sold on the open market via a carbon exchange. However, the use of municipal waste contracts and the bankability of these solutions is still a relatively new concept, thus RDF's financial advantage may be debatable. The European market for the production of RDF have been grown fast due to the European landfill directive and the imposition of landfill taxes. Refuse derived fuel (RDF) exports from the UK to Europe and beyond are expected to have reached 3.3 million tonnes in 2015, representing a near-500,000 tonnes increase on the previous year.

== Measurement of RDF and SRF properties: biogenic content ==
The biomass fraction of RDF and SRF has a monetary value under multiple greenhouse gas protocols, such as the European Union Emissions Trading Scheme and the Renewable Obligation Certificate program in the United Kingdom. Biomass is considered to be carbon-neutral since the CO_{2} liberated from the combustion of biomass is recycled in plants. The combusted biomass fraction of RDF/SRF is used by stationary combustion operators to reduce their overall reported CO_{2} emissions.

Several methods have been developed by the European CEN 343 working group to determine the biomass fraction of RDF/SRF. The initial two methods developed (CEN/TS 15440) were the manual sorting method and the selective dissolution method; a comparative assessment of these two methods is available. An alternative, but more expensive method was developed using the principles of radiocarbon dating. A technical review (CEN/TR 15591:2007) outlining the carbon-14 method was published in 2007, and a technical standard of the carbon dating method (CEN/TS 15747:2008) was published in 2008. In the United States, there is already an equivalent carbon-14 method under the standard method ASTM D6866.

Although carbon-14 dating can determine the biomass fraction of RDF/SRF, it cannot determine directly the biomass calorific value. Determining the calorific value is important for green certificate programs such as the Renewable Obligation Certificate program. These programs award certificates based on the energy produced from biomass. Several research papers, including the one commissioned by the Renewable Energy Association in the UK, have been published that demonstrate how the carbon-14 result can be used to calculate the biomass calorific value.

== Quality assurance of RDF and SRF properties: representative laboratory sub-sampling ==
There are major challenges related to the quality assurance and especially the accurate determination of the RDF / SRF thermal recovery (combustion) properties, due to their inherently variable (heterogeneous) composition. Recent advances enable optimal sub-sampling schemes to arrive from the SRF / SRF sample of say 1 kg to the g or mg to be tested in the analytical devices such as the bomb calorimetry or TGA. With such solutions representative sub-sampling can be secured, but less so for the chlorine content. The new evidence suggests that the theory of sampling (ToS) may be overestimating the processing effort needed, to obtain a representative sub-sample.

== Regional use ==
=== Campania ===
In 2009, in response to the Naples waste management issue in Campania, Italy, the Acerra incineration facility was completed at a cost of over €350 million. The incinerator burns 600,000 tons of waste per year. The energy produced from the facility is enough to power 200,000 households per year.

=== Iowa ===
The first full-scale waste-to-energy facility in the US was the Arnold O. Chantland Resource Recovery Plant, built in 1975 located in Ames, Iowa. This plant also produces RDF that is sent to a local power plant for supplemental fuel.

=== Manchester ===
The city of Manchester, in the north west of England, is in the process of awarding a contract for the use of RDF which will be produced by proposed mechanical biological treatment facilities as part of a huge PFI contract. The Greater Manchester Waste Disposal Authority has recently announced there is significant market interest in initial bids for the use of RDF which is projected to be produced in tonnages up to 900,000 tonnes per annum.

=== Bollnäs ===
During spring 2008 Bollnäs Ovanåkers Renhållnings AB (BORAB) in Sweden, started their new waste-to-energy plant. Municipal solid waste as well as industrial waste is turned into refuse-derived fuel. The 70,000-80,000 tonnes RDF that is produced per annum is used to power the nearby BFB-plant, which provides the citizens of Bollnäs with electricity and district heating.

=== Israel ===
In late March 2017, Israel launched its own RDF plant at the Hiriya Recycling Park; which daily will intake about 1,500 tonnes of household waste, which will amount to around half a million tonnes of waste each year, with an estimated production of 500 tonnes of RDF daily. The plant is part of Israel's "diligent effort to improve and advance waste management in Israel."

=== United Arab Emirates ===
In October 2018, the UAE's Ministry of Climate Change and Environment signed a concession agreement with Emirates RDF (BESIX, Tech Group Eco Single Owner, Griffin Refineries) to develop and operate a RDF facility in the Emirate of Umm Al Quwain. The facility will receive 1,000 tons per day of household waste and convert the waste of 550,000 residents from the emirates of Ajman and Umm Al Quwain into RDF. RDF will be used in cement factories to partially replace the traditional use of gas or coal.

== See also ==
- Biodrying
- Cement kiln
- Heavy metals
- Isle of Wight gasification facility
- Mechanical biological treatment
- Mechanical heat treatment
- Open burning of waste
- Waste-to-energy
