= Biodegradable waste =

Organic matter that can be broken down

Biodegradable waste includes any organic matter in waste which can be broken down into carbon dioxide, water, methane, compost, humus, and simple organic molecules by micro-organisms and other living things by composting, aerobic digestion, anaerobic digestion or similar processes. It mainly includes kitchen waste (spoiled food, trimmings, inedible parts), ash, soil, dung and other plant matter. In waste management, it also includes some inorganic materials which can be decomposed by bacteria. Such materials include gypsum and its products such as plasterboard and other simple sulfates which can be decomposed by sulfate reducing bacteria to yield hydrogen sulfide in anaerobic land-fill conditions.

In domestic waste collection, the scope of biodegradable waste may be narrowed to include only those degradable wastes capable of being handled in the local waste handling facilities. To address this, many local waste management districts are integrating programs related to sort the biodegradable waste for composting or other waste valorization strategies, where biodegradable waste gets reused for other products, such as using agricultural waste for fiber production or biochar.

Biodegradable waste when not handled properly can have an outsized impact on climate change, especially through methane emissions from anaerobic fermentation that produces landfill gas. Other approaches to reducing the impact include reducing the amount of waste produced, such as through reducing food waste.

== Sources ==
Biodegradable waste can be found in municipal solid waste (sometimes called biodegradable municipal waste, or as green waste, food waste, paper waste and biodegradable plastics). Other biodegradable wastes include human waste, manure, sewage, sewage sludge and slaughterhouse waste. In the absence of oxygen, much of this waste will decay to methane by anaerobic digestion.

In the UK, 7.4 million tonnes of biodegradable waste was sent to landfill in 2018 having reduced from 7.8 million tonnes in 2017.

== Collection and processing ==
In many parts of the developed world, biodegradable waste is separated from the rest of the waste stream, either by separate curb-side collection or by waste sorting after collection. At the point of collection such waste is often referred to as green waste. Removing such waste from the rest of the waste stream substantially reduces waste volumes for disposal and also allows biodegradable waste to be composted.

Biodegradable waste can be used for composting or a resource for heat, electricity and fuel by means of incineration or anaerobic digestion. Swiss Kompogas and the Danish AIKAN process are examples of anaerobic digestion of biodegradable waste. While incineration can recover the most energy, anaerobic digestion plants retain nutrients and make compost for soil amendment and still recover some of the contained energy in the form of biogas. Kompogas produced 27 million Kwh of electricity and biogas in 2009. The oldest of the company's lorries has achieved 1,000,000 kilometers driven with biogas from household waste in the last 15 years.

=== Valorization ===
==== Crop residue ====
Crop residue, such as corncob, and other residues from the food processing industry, such as residues from biorefineries, have high potential for use in further processes, such as producing biofuel, bioplastics, and other biomaterials for industrial processes.

==== Food waste ====
One of the more fruitful fields of work is food waste—when deposited in landfills, food waste produces the greenhouse gas methane and other toxic compounds that can be dangerous to humans and local ecosystems. Landfill gas utilization and municipal composting can capture and use the organic nutrients. Food waste collected from non-industrial sources is harder to use, because it often has much greater diversity than other sources of waste—different locations and different windows of time produce very different compositions of material, making it hard to use for industrial processes.

Transforming food waste into either food products, feed products, or converting it to or extracting food or feed ingredients is termed food waste valorisation. Valorisation of food waste offers an economical and environmental opportunity, which can reduce the problems of its conventional disposal. Food wastes have been demonstrated to be valuable bioresources that can be utilised to obtain a number of useful products, including biofertilizers, bioplastics, biofuels, chemicals, and nutraceuticals. There is much potential to recycle food wastes by conversion to insect protein.

==== Human excreta ====
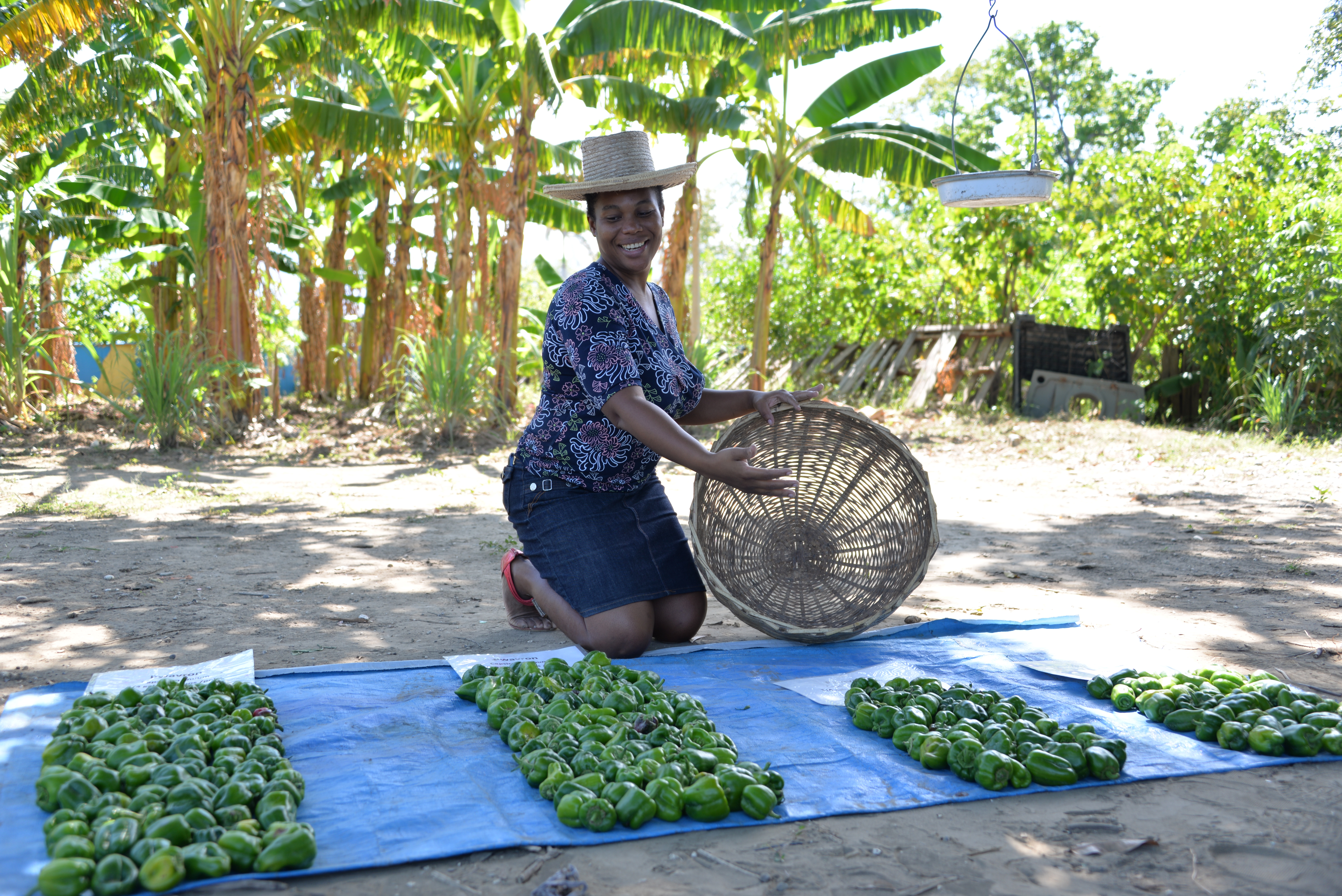
Harvest of capsicum grown with compost made from human excreta at an experimental garden in Haiti

Reuse of human excreta can be safe or unsafe. Beneficial uses of the treated excreta may focus on using the plant-available nutrients (mainly nitrogen, phosphorus and potassium) that are contained in the treated excreta. They may also make use of the organic matter and energy contained in the excreta. To a lesser extent, reuse of the excreta's water content might also take place, although this is better known as water reclamation from municipal wastewater. The intended reuse applications for the nutrient content may include: soil conditioner or fertilizer in agriculture or horticultural activities. Other reuse applications, which focus more on the organic matter content of the excreta, include use as a fuel source or as an energy source in the form of biogas.

There is a large and growing number of treatment options to make excreta safe and manageable for the intended reuse option. Options include urine diversion and dehydration of feces (urine-diverting dry toilets), composting (composting toilets or external composting processes), sewage sludge treatment technologies and a range of fecal sludge treatment processes. They all achieve various degrees of pathogen removal and reduction in water content for easier handling. Pathogens of concern are enteric bacteria, virus, protozoa, and helminth eggs in feces. As the helminth eggs are the pathogens that are the most difficult to destroy with treatment processes, they are commonly used as an indicator organism in reuse schemes. Other health risks and environmental pollution aspects that need to be considered include spreading micropollutants, pharmaceutical residues and nitrate in the environment which could cause groundwater pollution and thus potentially affect drinking water quality.

== Climate change impacts ==
=== Landfill gas ===
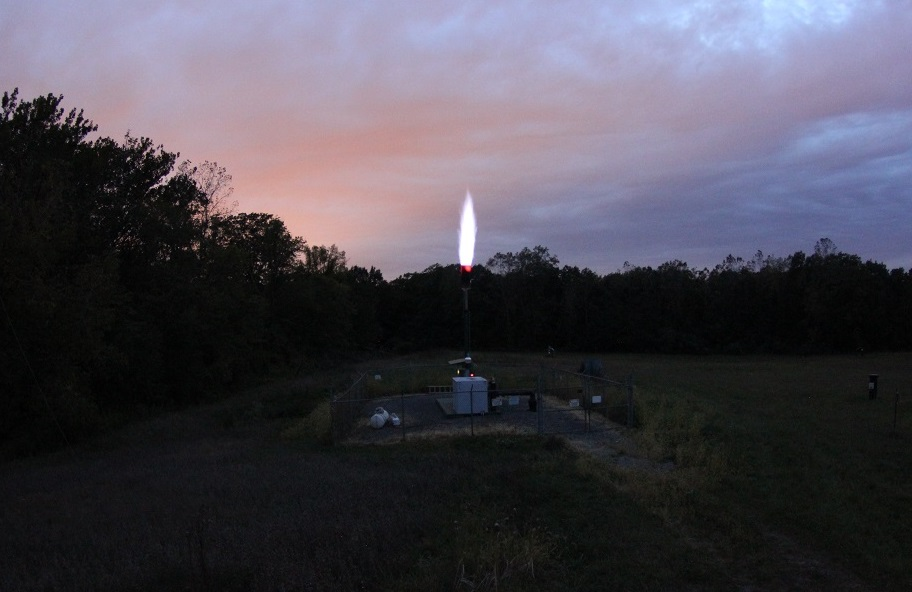
A gas flare produced by a landfill in Lake County, Ohio

Landfill gas is a mix of different gases created by the action of microorganisms within a landfill as they decompose organic waste, including for example, food waste and paper waste. Landfill gas is a type of biogas, which is approximately forty to sixty percent methane, with the remainder being mostly carbon dioxide. Landfill gas often contains nitrogen gas that is pulled in from the atmosphere during collection. Trace amounts of non-methane volatile organic compounds (VOCs), siloxanes, and hydrogen sulfide comprise the remainder (<1%). These trace gases include a large array of species, mainly simple hydrocarbons.

Landfill gases have an influence on climate change. The major components are CO_{2} and methane, both of which are greenhouse gases. Methane in the atmosphere is a far more potent greenhouse gas with a global warming potential of 27 over a one-hundred year period. Landfills are the third-largest source of methane in the US.

Because of the significant negative effects of these gases, regulatory regimes have been set up to monitor landfill gas, reduce the amount of biodegradable content in municipal waste, and to create landfill gas utilization strategies, which include gas flaring or capture for electricity generation.

=== Food waste ===
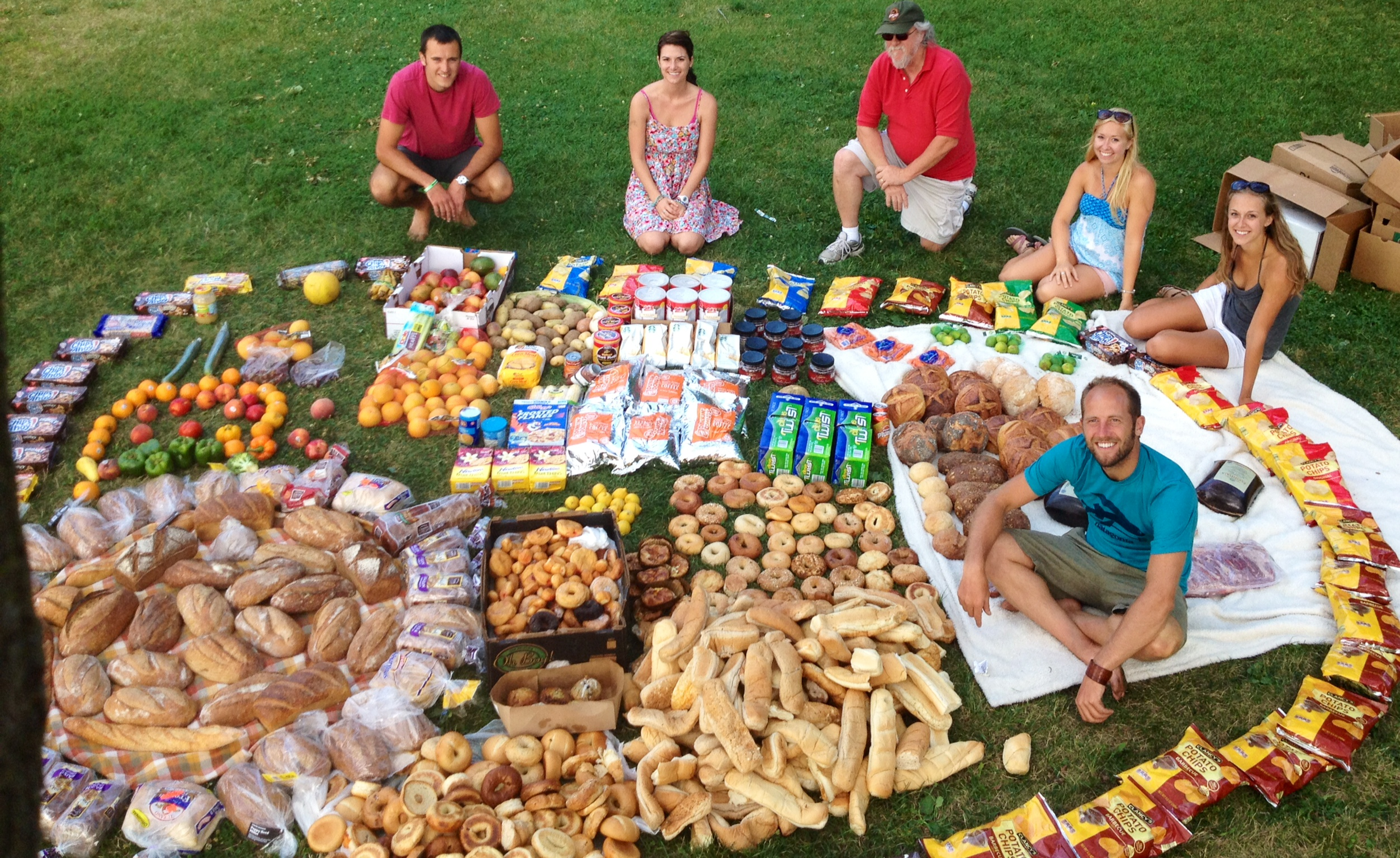
Food recovered by food waste critic Robin Greenfield in Madison, Wisconsin, from two days of recovery from dumpsters

Food loss and waste is food that is discarded or otherwise lost uneaten. This occurs throughout all the processes involved in the food system, during production, processing, distribution, retail, and consumption, but most food waste is created after consumers buy the food. Overall, about one-third of the world's food is thrown away, and a huge amount of resources used in food production are wasted. Global food waste amounts to 931 million tonnes annually (about 121 kg per person) across three sectors: 61 percent from households, 26 percent from food service and 13 percent from retail.

Food waste is addressed through prevention (e.g. by food preservation), reuse (e.g. food donation), animal feed, or recycling. Discarding food in landfills is to be avoided because it is a major source of the greenhouse gas methane. Reducing food waste in all parts of the food system is an important part of reducing the environmental impact of agriculture, by reducing the total amount of water, land, and other resources used.

Wasted food is a major part of the impact of agriculture on climate change (it amounts to 3.3 billion tons of carbon dioxide equivalent emissions annually) and other environmental issues, such as land use, water use and loss of biodiversity. It also conflicts with food insecurity in parts of the world. The UN's Sustainable Development Goals seek to "halve global per capita food waste at the retail and consumer levels and reduce food losses along production and supply chains, including post-harvest losses" by 2030. In the 2022 United Nations Biodiversity Conference nations agreed to reduce food waste by 50% by the year 2030.

== See also ==
- Biodegradability prediction
- Biodegradable bags
- Biodegradation
- Biodrying
- Compost
- Brown waste
- Green waste
- Landfarming
- Landfill diversion
- List of waste types
- Miniwaste
- Sewage treatment
