= Mechanical biological treatment =

Type of waste processing facility

A mechanical biological treatment (MBT) system is a type of waste processing facility that combines a sorting facility with a form of biological treatment such as composting or anaerobic digestion. MBT plants are designed to process mixed household waste as well as commercial and industrial wastes.

== Process ==
Process flow chart

The terms mechanical biological treatment or mechanical biological pre-treatment relate to a group of solid waste treatment systems. These systems enable the recovery of materials contained within the mixed waste and facilitate the stabilisation of the biodegradable component of the material. Twenty two facilities in the UK have implemented MBT/BMT treatment processes.

The sorting component of the plants typically resemble a materials recovery facility. This component is either configured to recover the individual elements of the waste or produce a refuse-derived fuel that can be used for the generation of power.

The components of the mixed waste stream that can be recovered include:

- Ferrous metal
- Non-ferrous metal
- Plastic
- Glass

== Terminology ==
MBT is also sometimes termed biological mechanical treatment (BMT), however this simply refers to the order of processing (i.e., the biological phase of the system precedes the mechanical sorting). MBT should not be confused with mechanical heat treatment (MHT).

== Mechanical sorting ==
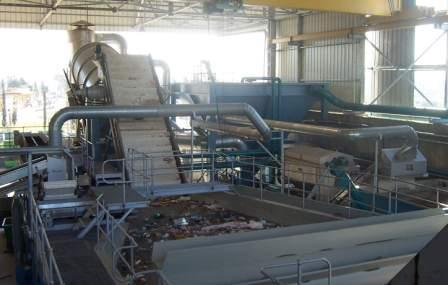
Wet material recovery facility, Hiriya, Israel

The "mechanical" element is usually an automated mechanical sorting stage. This either removes recyclable elements from a mixed waste stream (such as metals, plastics, glass, and paper) or processes them. It typically involves factory style conveyors, industrial magnets, eddy current separators, trommels, shredders, and other tailor made systems, or the sorting is done manually at hand picking stations. The mechanical element has a number of similarities to a materials recovery facility (MRF).

Some systems integrate a wet MRF to separate by density and flotation and to recover and wash the recyclable elements of the waste in a form that can be sent for recycling. MBT can alternatively process the waste to produce a high calorific fuel termed refuse derived fuel (RDF). RDF can be used in cement kilns or thermal combustion power plants and is generally made up from plastics and biodegradable organic waste. Systems which are configured to produce RDF include the Herhof and Ecodeco processes. It is a common misconception that all MBT processes produce RDF; this is not the case, and depends strictly on system configuration and suitable local markets for MBT outputs.

== Biological processing ==
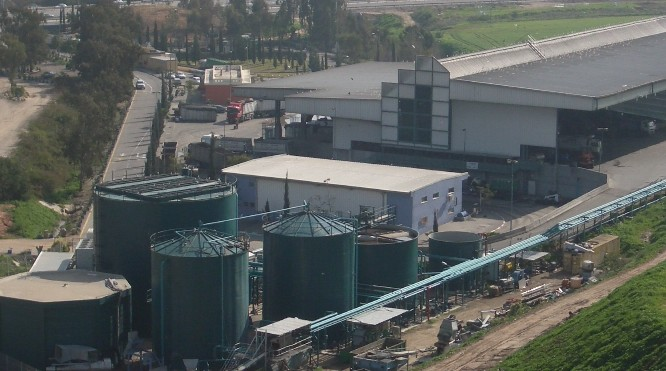
Twin stage and upflow anaerobic sludge blanket digestion (UASB) anaerobic digesters

The "biological" element refers to either:

- Anaerobic digestion
- Composting
- Biodrying

Anaerobic digestion harnesses anaerobic microorganisms to break down the biodegradable component of the waste to produce biogas and soil improver. The biogas can be used to generate electricity and heat.

Biological can also refer to a composting stage. Here the organic component is broken down by naturally occurring aerobic microorganisms. They break down the waste into carbon dioxide and compost. There is no green energy produced by systems employing only composting treatment for the biodegradable waste.

In the case of biodrying, the waste material undergoes a period of rapid heating through the action of aerobic microbes. During this partial composting stage the heat generated by the microbes result in rapid drying of the waste. These systems are often configured to produce a refuse-derived fuel where a dry, light material is advantageous for later transport and combustion.

Some systems incorporate both anaerobic digestion and composting. This may either take the form of a full anaerobic digestion phase, followed by the maturation (composting) of the digestate. Alternatively a partial anaerobic digestion phase can be induced on water that is percolated through the raw waste, dissolving the readily available sugars, with the remaining material being sent to a windrow composting facility.

By processing the biodegradable waste either by anaerobic digestion or by composting MBT technologies help to reduce the contribution of greenhouse gases to global warming.

Usable wastes for this system:

- Municipal solid waste
- Commercial and industrial waste
- Sewage sludge

Possible products of this system:

- Renewable fuel (biogas) leading to renewable power
- Recovered recyclable materials such as metals, paper, plastics, glass etc.
- Digestate - an organic fertiliser and soil improver
- Carbon credits – additional revenues
- High calorific fraction refuse derived fuel - renewable fuel content dependent upon biological component
- Residual unusable materials prepared for their final safe treatment (e.g., incineration or gasification) and/or landfill

Further advantages:

- Small fraction of inert residual waste
- Reduction of the waste volume to be deposited to at least a half (density > 1.3 t/m^{3}), thus the lifetime of the landfill is at least twice as long as usual
- Utilisation of the leachate in the process
- Landfill gas not problematic as biological component of waste has been stabilised
- Daily covering of landfill not necessary

== Consideration of applications ==
MBT systems can form an integral part of a region's waste treatment infrastructure. These systems are typically integrated with kerbside collection schemes. In the event that a Refuse-Derived Fuel is produced as a by-product then a combustion facility would be required. This could either be an incineration facility or a gasifier.

Alternatively MBT solutions can diminish the need for home separation and kerbside collection of recyclable elements of waste. This gives the ability of local authorities, municipalities and councils to reduce the use of waste vehicles on the roads and keep recycling rates high.

== Position of environmental groups ==
Friends of the Earth suggests that the best environmental route for residual waste is to firstly maximise removal of remaining recyclable materials from the waste stream (such as metals, plastics and paper). The amount of waste remaining should be composted or anaerobically digested and disposed of to landfill, unless sufficiently clean to be used as compost.

A report by Eunomia undertook a detailed analysis of the climate impacts of different residual waste technologies. It found that an MBT process that extracts both the metals and plastics prior to landfilling is one of the best options for dealing with our residual waste, and has a lower impact than either MBT processes producing RDF for incineration or incineration of waste without MBT.

Friends of the Earth does not support MBT plants that produce refuse derived fuel (RDF), and believes MBT processes should occur in small, localised treatment plants.

== See also ==
- Anaerobic digestion
- Composting
- List of solid waste treatment technologies
- Materials recovery facility
- Plastic pollution
- Renewable energy
- Waste
- Waste management
