= Paul Montrone =

American businessman

- Born: May 8, 1941 (age 85); Scranton, Pennsylvania
- Education: University of Scranton Columbia University Business School
- Occupations: Chairman and CEO of Bayberry Financial Services Liberty Lane Partners & Latona Associates
- Spouse: Sandra Gaudenzi Montrone (May 30, 1963-Present)
- Website: paulmontrone.com

Paul M. Montrone (born May 8, 1941) is the chairman of several financial entities—Bayberry Financial Services, Liberty Lane Partners and Latona Associates, and was previously CEO of several operating companies, including Fisher Scientific Inc.

== Early life and career ==
Montrone was born in Scranton, Pennsylvania. He obtained a Bachelor of Science magna cum laude from the University of Scranton in 1962 and a PhD from Columbia University Business School in 1965.

Montrone began his career at the Pentagon, serving in the Systems Analysis Group in the Office of the Secretary of Defense Robert McNamara while a Captain in the U.S. Army. He later served as executive vice president and CFO of Wheelabrator-Frye Inc., executive vice president of the Signal Companies, Inc. and its successor, AlliedSignal Inc. (now Honeywell) President of the Henley Group, Inc., and CEO of Wheelabrator Technologies.

Montrone eventually became president and CEO of Fisher Scientific in 1991 and chairman in 1998, resigning upon the company's merger with Thermo Electron in 2006. After the merger, he moved into the financial business as a founder of Perspecta Trust, LLC, a New Hampshire based trust company, and other financial entities, as described above.

Montrone was also active in numerous government matters at both the federal and NH State level.

During the Clinton administration, he was a member of the President’s Advisory Commission on Consumer Protection and Quality in the Health Care Industry, and a founder of the National Forum for Health Care Quality Measurement and Reporting. He was a director of the Healthcare Leadership Council and the New England Healthcare Institute. He was also a director and treasurer of the Foundation for the National Institutes of Health.

Montrone has been involved in other Washington, D.C., business policy matters, mainly through his activity with the Business Roundtable, where he was a member of its planning committee and the Health and Retirement Task Force and Chairman of its Civil Justice Reform Taskforce.

Montrone was active in various non profit entities. He served as president and CEO of The Metropolitan Opera, where he is now president emeritus. His current other nonprofit boards include the New England Conservatory, the Boston Symphony Orchestra, and the Columbia University Graduate School of Business. He is also a founder of the Peace on Earth Foundation, Friends of Italian Americans and Citizens Count.
