= Incineration =

Waste treatment process

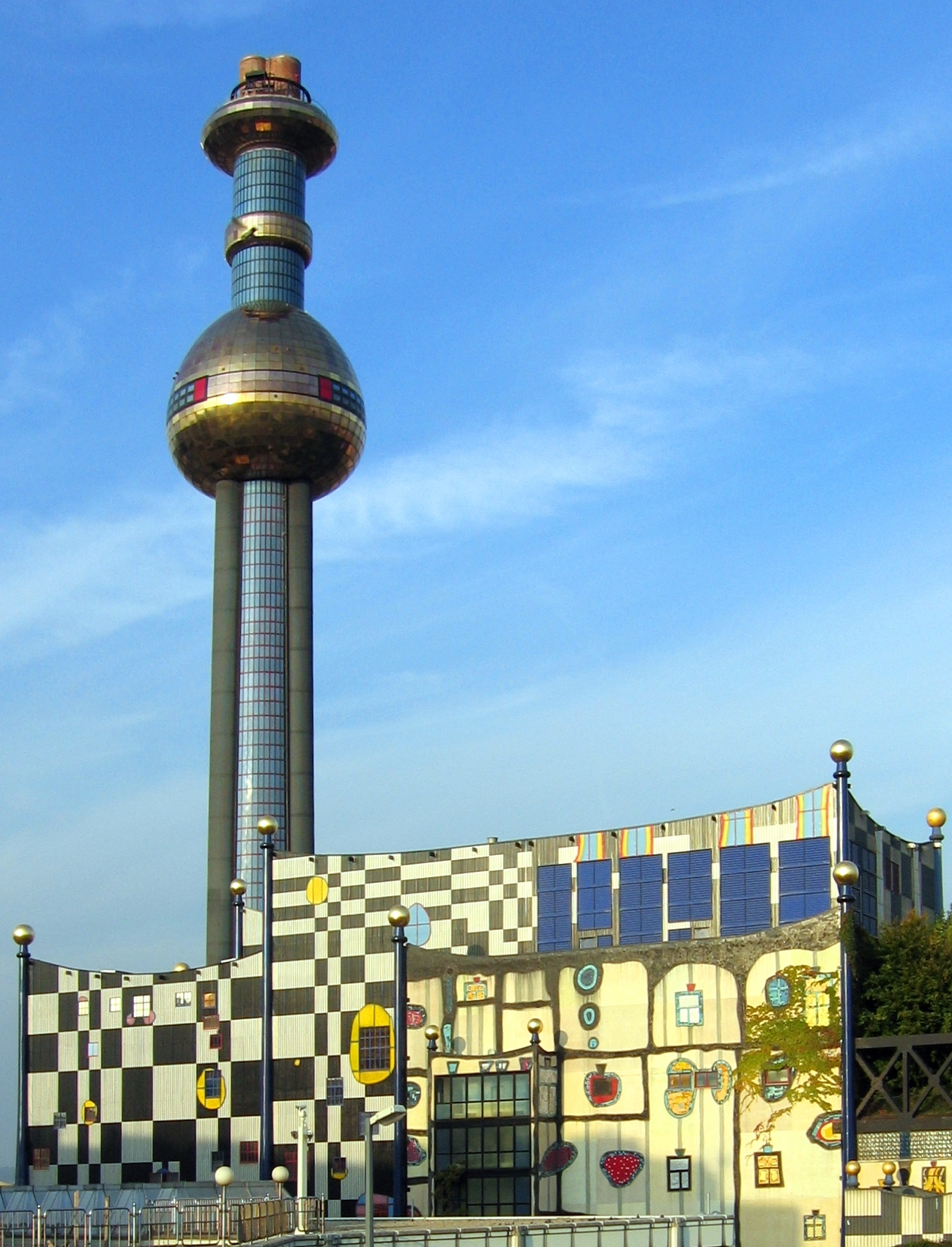
The incineration plant in Vienna, Austria, designed by Friedensreich Hundertwasser

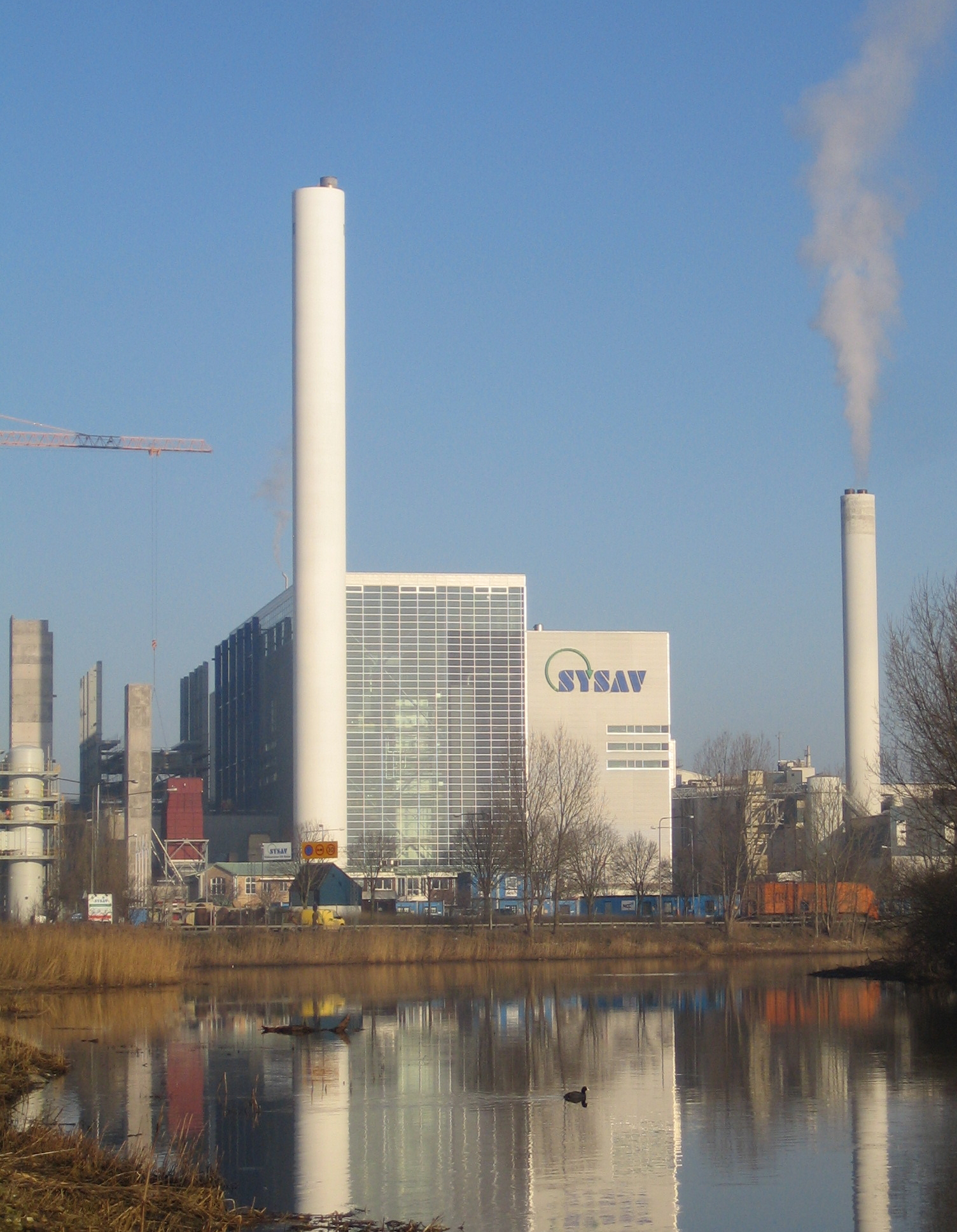
SYSAV incineration plant in Malmö, Sweden, capable of handling 25 tonnes (28 short tons) per hour of household waste. To the left of the main stack, a new identical oven line is under construction (March 2007).

Incineration is a waste treatment process that involves the combustion of substances contained in waste materials. Industrial plants for waste incineration are commonly referred to as waste-to-energy facilities. Incineration and other high-temperature waste treatment systems are described as "thermal treatment". Incineration of waste materials converts the waste into ash, flue gas and heat. The ash is mostly formed by the inorganic constituents of the waste and may take the form of solid lumps or particulates carried by the flue gas. The flue gases must be cleaned of gaseous and particulate pollutants before they are dispersed into the atmosphere. In some cases, the heat that is generated by incineration can be used to generate electric power.

Incineration with energy recovery is one of several waste-to-energy technologies such as gasification, pyrolysis and anaerobic digestion. While incineration and gasification technologies are similar in principle, the energy produced from incineration is high-temperature heat whereas combustible gas is often the main energy product from gasification. Incineration and gasification may also be implemented without energy and materials recovery.

In several countries, there are still concerns from experts and local communities about the environmental effect of incinerators (see arguments against incineration).

In some countries, incinerators built just a few decades ago often did not include a materials separation to remove hazardous, bulky or recyclable materials before combustion. These facilities tended to risk the health of the plant workers and the local environment due to inadequate levels of gas cleaning and combustion process control. Most of these facilities did not generate electricity.

Incinerators reduce the solid mass of the original waste by 80–85% and the volume (already compressed somewhat in garbage trucks) by 95–96%, depending on composition and degree of recovery of materials such as metals from the ash for recycling. This means that while incineration does not completely replace landfilling, it significantly reduces the necessary volume for disposal. Garbage trucks often reduce the volume of waste in a built-in compressor before delivery to the incinerator. Alternatively, at landfills, the volume of the uncompressed garbage can be reduced by approximately 70% by using a stationary steel compressor, albeit with a significant energy cost. In many countries, simpler waste compaction is a common practice for compaction at landfills.

Incineration has particularly strong benefits for the treatment of certain waste types in niche areas such as clinical wastes and certain hazardous wastes where pathogens and toxins can be destroyed by high temperatures. Examples include chemical multi-product plants with diverse toxic or very toxic wastewater streams, which cannot be routed to a conventional wastewater treatment plant.

Waste combustion is particularly popular in countries such as Japan, Singapore and the Netherlands, where land is a scarce resource. Denmark and Sweden have been leaders by using the energy generated from incineration for more than a century, in localised combined heat and power facilities supporting district heating schemes. In 2005, waste incineration produced 4.8% of the electricity consumption and 13.7% of the total domestic heat consumption in Denmark. A number of other European countries rely heavily on incineration for handling municipal waste, in particular Luxembourg, the Netherlands, Germany, and France.

== History ==
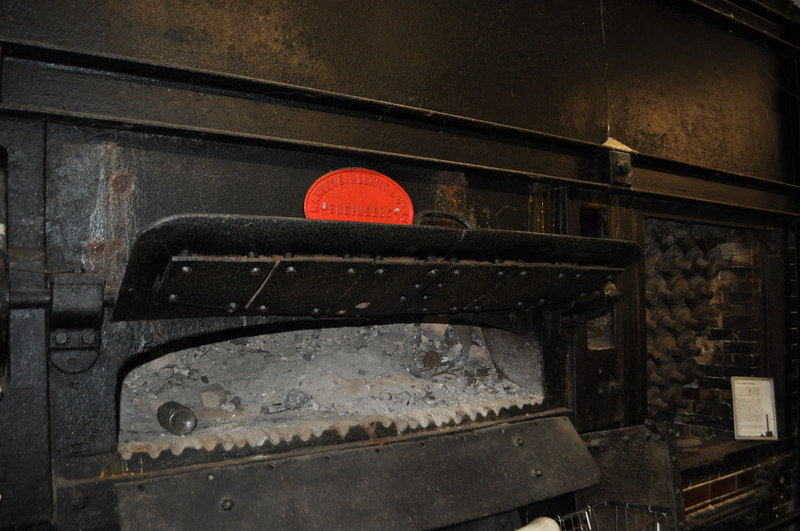
Manlove, Alliott & Co. Ltd. 1894 destructor furnace at Cambridge Museum of Technology

The first UK incinerators for waste disposal were built in Nottingham by Manlove, Alliott & Co. Ltd. in 1874 to a design patented by Alfred Fryer. They were originally known as destructors.

The first US incinerator was built in 1885 on Governors Island in New York, NY. The first facility in Austria-Hungary was built in 1905 in Brunn.

== Technology ==
There are various types of incinerator plant design: moving grate, fixed grate, multiple hearth, rotary-kiln, and fluidised bed. Modern incinerators include pollution mitigation equipment such as flue gas cleaning.

=== Burn pile ===
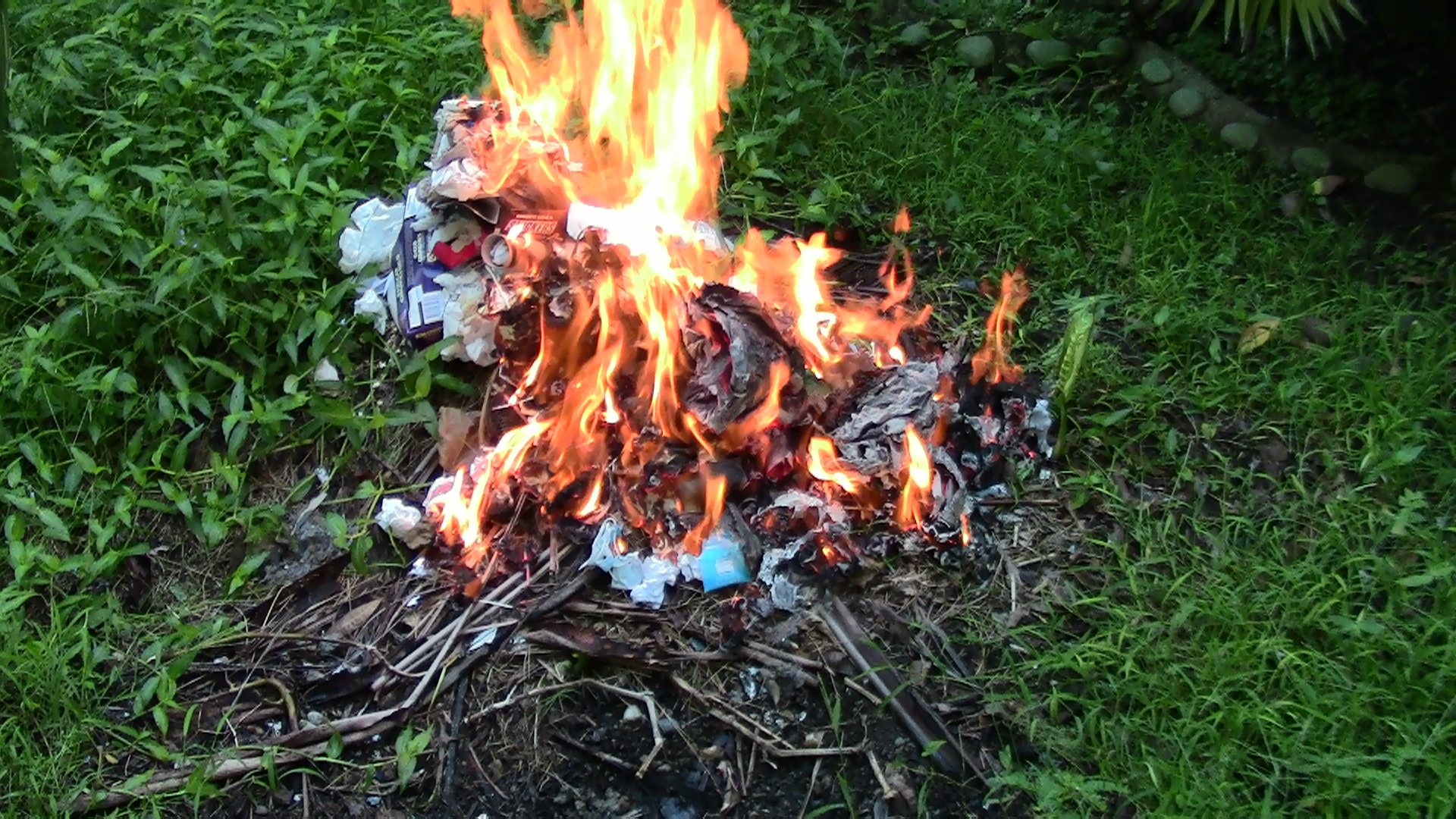
A typical small burn pile in a garden.

The burn pile or the burn pit is one of the simplest and earliest forms of waste disposal, consisting of a mound of combustible materials piled on the open ground and set on fire.

Burn piles have spread uncontrolled fires. Burning material blown from the wind and small lightweight ignited embers lifted off the pile via convection can reach surrounding grass or buildings. As interior structures of the pile are consumed, the pile can shift and collapse, spreading the burn area. Burn piles often do not result in full combustion of waste and therefore produce particulate pollution.

=== Burn barrel ===
The burn barrel is a somewhat more controlled form of private waste incineration, containing the burning material inside a metal barrel, with a metal grating over the exhaust. The barrel prevents the spread of burning material in windy conditions, and as the combustibles are reduced they can only settle down into the barrel. The exhaust grating helps to prevent the spread of burning embers. Typically steel 55-US-gallon (210 L) drums are used as burn barrels, with air vent holes cut or drilled around the base for air intake. Over time, the very high heat of incineration causes the metal to oxidize and rust, and eventually the barrel itself is consumed by the heat and must be replaced.

The private burning of dry cellulosic/paper products is generally clean-burning, producing no visible smoke, but plastics in the household waste can cause private burning to create a public nuisance, generating acrid odors and fumes that make eyes burn and water. A two-layered design enables secondary combustion, reducing smoke. Most urban communities ban burn barrels and certain rural communities may have prohibitions on open burning, especially those home to many residents not familiar with this common rural practice.

As of 2006 in the United States, private rural household or farm waste incineration of small quantities was typically permitted so long as it is not a nuisance to others, does not pose a risk of fire such as in dry conditions, and the fire does not produce dense, noxious smoke. A handful of states, such as New York, Minnesota, and Wisconsin, have laws or regulations either banning or strictly regulating open burning due to health and nuisance effects. People intending to burn waste may be required to contact a state agency in advance to check current fire risk and conditions, and to alert officials of the controlled fire that will occur.

=== Moving grate ===
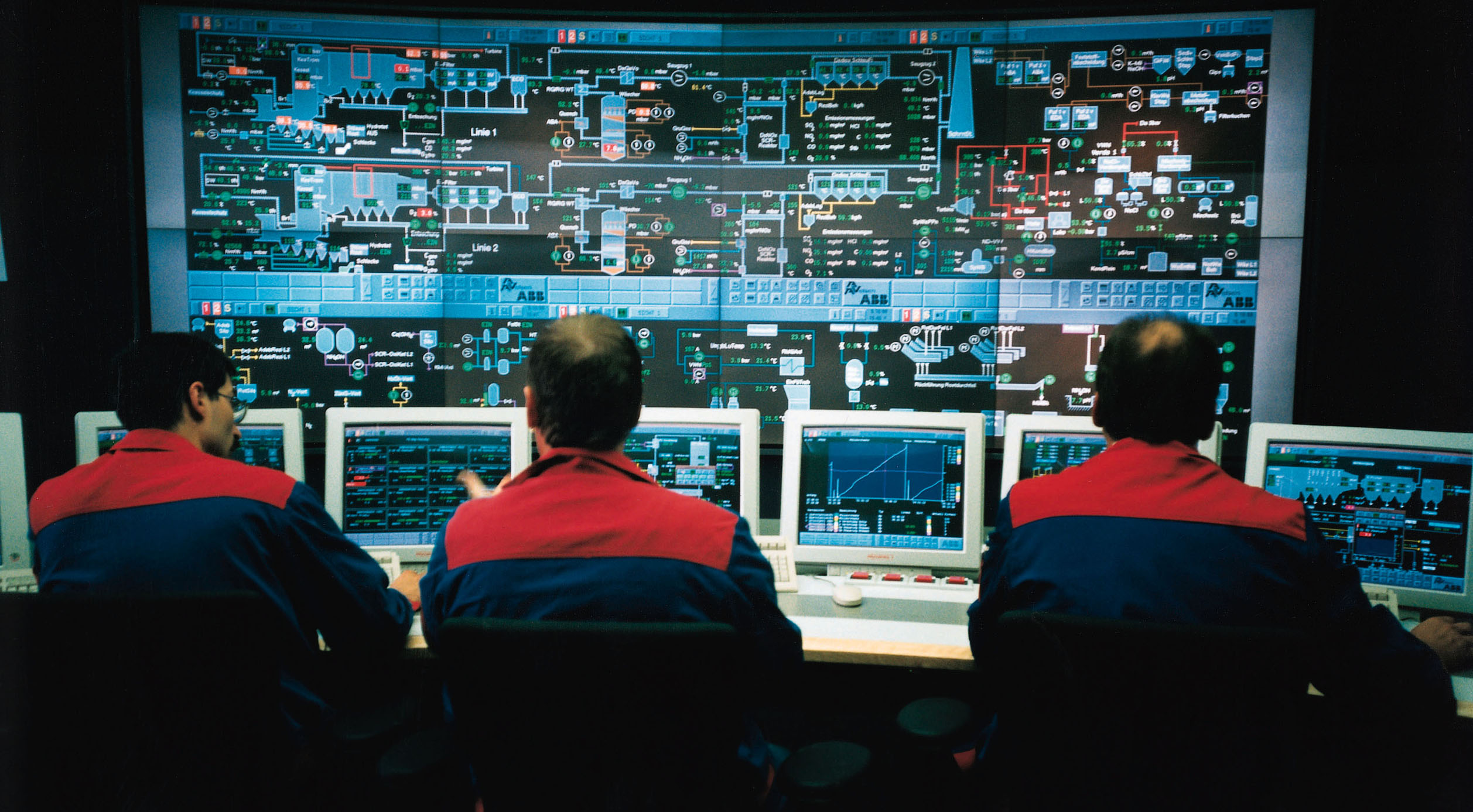
Control room of a typical moving grate incinerator overseeing two boiler lines

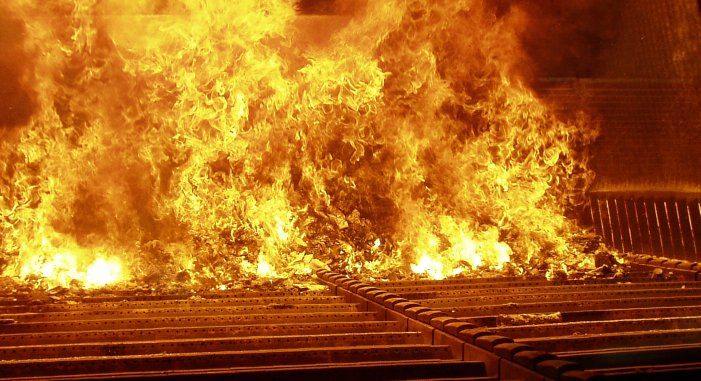
Municipal solid waste in the furnace of a moving grate incinerator capable of handling 15 metric tons (17 short tons) of waste per hour. The holes in the grate supplying the primary combustion air are visible.

The typical incineration plant for municipal solid waste is a moving grate incinerator. The moving grate enables the movement of waste through the combustion chamber to be optimized to allow a more efficient and complete combustion. A single moving grate boiler can handle up to 35 metric tons (39 short tons) of waste per hour, and can operate 8,000 hours per year with only one scheduled stop for inspection and maintenance of about one month's duration. Moving grate incinerators are sometimes referred to as municipal solid waste incinerators (MSWIs).

The waste is introduced by a waste crane through the "throat" at one end of the grate, from where it moves down over the descending grate to the ash pit in the other end. Here the ash is removed through a water lock.

Part of the combustion air (primary combustion air) is supplied through the grate from below. This air flow also has the purpose of cooling the grate itself. Cooling is important for the mechanical strength of the grate, and many moving grates are also water-cooled internally.

Secondary combustion air is supplied into the boiler at high speed through nozzles over the grate. It facilitates complete combustion of the flue gases by introducing turbulence for better mixing and by ensuring a surplus of oxygen. In multiple/stepped hearth incinerators, the secondary combustion air is introduced in a separate chamber downstream the primary combustion chamber.

According to the European Waste Incineration Directive, incineration plants must be designed to ensure that the flue gases reach a temperature of at least 850 °C (1,560 °F) for 2 seconds in order to ensure proper breakdown of toxic organic substances. In order to comply with this at all times, it is required to install backup auxiliary burners (often fueled by oil), which are fired into the boiler in case the heating value of the waste becomes too low to reach this temperature alone.

The flue gases are then cooled in the superheaters, where the heat is transferred to steam, heating the steam to typically 400 °C (752 °F) at a pressure of 40 bars (580 psi) for the electricity generation in the turbine. At this point, the flue gas has a temperature of around 200 °C (392 °F), and is passed to the flue gas cleaning system.

Often, incineration plants consist of several separate 'boiler lines' (boilers and flue gas treatment plants), so that waste can continue to be received at one boiler line while the others are undergoing maintenance, repair, or upgrading. In Scandinavia, scheduled maintenance is performed during summer, when the demand for district heating is low.

=== Fixed grate ===
The older and simpler kind of incinerator was a brick-lined cell with a fixed metal grate over a lower ash pit, with one opening in the top or side for loading and another opening in the side for removing incombustible solids called clinkers. Many small incinerators formerly found in apartment houses have now been replaced by waste compactors.

=== Rotary-kiln ===
The rotary-kiln incinerator is used by municipalities and by large industrial plants. This design of incinerator has two chambers: a primary chamber and secondary chamber. The primary chamber in a rotary kiln incinerator consists of an inclined refractory lined cylindrical tube. The inner refractory lining serves as sacrificial layer to protect the kiln structure. This refractory layer needs to be replaced from time to time. Movement of the cylinder on its axis facilitates movement of waste. In the primary chamber, there is conversion of solid fraction to gases, through volatilization, destructive distillation and partial combustion reactions. The secondary chamber is necessary to complete gas phase combustion reactions.

The clinkers spill out at the end of the cylinder. A tall flue-gas stack, fan, or steam jet supplies the needed draft. Ash drops through the grate, but many particles are carried along with the hot gases. The particles and any combustible gases may be combusted in an "afterburner".

=== Fluidized bed ===
These are vertical steel vessel lined with refractory material and having air nozzles located at the bottom of the vessel. The lower part of the vessel is fed with a mixture of fuel, waste, sand, and other materials (e.g., limestone to control sulfur dioxide) and a jet of airflow is forced through to agitate and mixing the particles into fluid like suspension. Thus a fluidized bed is created and fuel and waste can now be introduced. The mixed gases and solids promotes heat transfer and chemical reaction. These are particularly suited for sewage sludge.

=== Specialized incinerator ===
Furniture factory sawdust incinerators need much attention as these have to handle resin powder and many flammable substances. Controlled combustion, burn back prevention systems are essential as dust suspended in the air resembles the fire catch phenomenon of any liquid petroleum gas.

=== Use of heat ===
The heat produced by an incinerator can be used to generate steam which may then be used to drive a turbine in order to produce electricity. The typical amount of net energy that can be produced per tonne municipal waste is about 2/3 MWh of electricity and 2 MWh of district heating. Thus, incinerating about 600 metric tons (660 short tons) per day of waste will produce about 400 MWh of electrical energy per day (17 MW of electrical power continuously for 24 hours) and 1200 MWh of district heating energy each day.

== Pollution ==
Incineration has a number of outputs such as the ash and the emission to the atmosphere of flue gas. Before the flue gas cleaning system, if installed, the flue gases may contain particulate matter, heavy metals, dioxins, furans, sulfur dioxide, and hydrochloric acid. If plants have inadequate flue gas cleaning, these outputs may add a significant pollution component to stack emissions.

In a study from 1997, Delaware Solid Waste Authority found that, for same amount of produced energy, incineration plants emitted fewer particles, hydrocarbons and less SO_{2}, HCl, CO and NO_{x} than coal-fired power plants, but more than natural gas–fired power plants. According to Germany's Ministry of the Environment, waste incinerators reduce the amount of some atmospheric pollutants by substituting power produced by coal-fired plants with power from waste-fired plants.

=== Gaseous emissions ===
==== Dioxin and furans ====
The most publicized concerns about the incineration of municipal solid wastes (MSW) involve the fear that it produces significant amounts of dioxin and furan emissions. Dioxins and furans are serious health hazards. The EPA announced in 2012 that the safe limit for human oral consumption is 0.7 picograms Toxic Equivalence (TEQ) per kilogram bodyweight per day, which works out to 17 billionths of a gram for a 150 lb person per year.

In 2005, the Ministry of the Environment of Germany, where there were 66 incinerators at that time, estimated that "...whereas in 1990 one third of all dioxin emissions in Germany came from incineration plants, for the year 2000 the figure was less than 1%. Chimneys and tiled stoves in private households alone discharge approximately 20 times more dioxin into the environment than incineration plants."

According to the United States Environmental Protection Agency, the combustion percentages of the total dioxin and furan inventory from all known and estimated sources in the U.S. (not only incineration) for each type of incineration are as follows: 35.1% backyard barrels; 26.6% medical waste; 6.3% municipal wastewater treatment sludge; 5.9% municipal waste combustion; 2.9% industrial wood combustion. Thus, the controlled combustion of waste accounted for 41.7% of the total dioxin inventory.

In 1987, before the governmental regulations required the use of emission controls, there was a total of 8,905.1 grams (314.12 oz) Toxic Equivalence (TEQ) of dioxin emissions from US municipal waste combustors. Today, the total emissions from the plants are 83.8 grams (2.96 oz) TEQ annually, a reduction of 99%.

Backyard barrel burning of household and garden wastes, still allowed in some rural areas, generates 580 grams (20 oz) of dioxins annually. Studies conducted by the US-EPA demonstrated that one family using a burn barrel produced more emissions than an incineration plant disposing of 200 metric tons (220 short tons) of waste per day by 1997 and five times that by 2007 due to increased chemicals in household trash and decreased emission by municipal incinerators using better technology.

Most of the improvement in U.S. dioxin emissions has been for large-scale municipal waste incinerators. As of 2000, although small-scale incinerators (those with a daily capacity of less than 250 tons) processed only 9% of the total waste combusted, these produced 83% of the dioxins and furans emitted by municipal waste combustion.

===== Dioxin cracking methods and limitations =====
The breakdown of dioxin requires exposure of the molecular ring to a sufficiently high temperature so as to trigger thermal breakdown of the strong molecular bonds holding it together. Small pieces of fly ash may be somewhat thick, and too brief an exposure to high temperature may only degrade dioxin on the surface of the ash. For a large volume air chamber, too brief an exposure may also result in only some of the exhaust gases reaching the full breakdown temperature. For this reason there is also a time element to the temperature exposure to ensure heating completely through the thickness of the fly ash and the volume of waste gases.

There are trade-offs between increasing either the temperature or exposure time. Generally where the molecular breakdown temperature is higher, the exposure time for heating can be shorter, but excessively high temperatures can also cause wear and damage to other parts of the incineration equipment. Likewise the breakdown temperature can be lowered to some degree but then the exhaust gases would require a greater lingering period of perhaps several minutes, which would require large/long treatment chambers that take up a great deal of treatment plant space.

A side effect of breaking the strong molecular bonds of dioxin is the potential for breaking the bonds of nitrogen gas (N_{2}) and oxygen gas (O_{2}) in the supply air. As the exhaust flow cools, these highly reactive detached atoms spontaneously reform bonds into reactive oxides such as NO_{x} in the flue gas, which can result in smog formation and acid rain if they were released directly into the local environment. These reactive oxides must be further neutralized with selective catalytic reduction (SCR) or selective non-catalytic reduction (see below).

===== Dioxin cracking in practice =====
The temperatures needed to break down dioxin are typically not reached when burning plastics outdoors in a burn barrel or garbage pit, causing high dioxin emissions. While plastic does usually burn in an open-air fire, the dioxins remain after combustion and either float off into the atmosphere, or may remain in the ash where it can be leached down into groundwater when rain falls on the ash pile. Fortunately, dioxin and furan compounds bond very strongly to solid surfaces and are not dissolved by water, so leaching processes are limited to the first few millimeters below the ash pile. Dioxin are completely destroyed at 800 °C (1,470 °F).

Modern municipal incinerator designs include a high-temperature zone, where the flue gas is sustained at a temperature above 850 °C (1,560 °F) for at least 2 seconds before it is cooled down. They are equipped with auxiliary heaters to ensure this at all times. These are often fueled by oil or natural gas, and are normally only active for a very small fraction of the time. Further, most modern incinerators utilize fabric filters (often with Teflon membranes to enhance collection of sub-micron particles) which can capture dioxins present in or on solid particles. The gas-phase dioxins can be substantially destroyed using catalysts, some of which can be present as part of the fabric filter bag structure.

For very small municipal incinerators, the required temperature for thermal breakdown of dioxin may be reached using a high-temperature electrical heating element, plus a selective catalytic reduction stage.

Although dioxins and furans may be destroyed by combustion, their reformation by a process known as 'de novo synthesis' as the emission gases cool is a probable source of the dioxins measured in emission stack tests from plants that have high combustion temperatures held at long residence times.

==== CO_{2} ====
As for other complete combustion processes, nearly all of the carbon content in the waste is emitted as CO_{2} to the atmosphere. MSW contains approximately the same mass fraction of carbon as CO_{2} itself (27%), so incineration of 1 ton of MSW produces approximately 1 ton of CO_{2}.

If the waste was landfilled without prior stabilization (typically via anaerobic digestion), 1 ton of MSW would produce approximately 62 cubic metres (2,200 cu ft) methane via the anaerobic decomposition of the biodegradable part of the waste. Since the global warming potential of methane is 34 and the weight of 62 cubic meters of methane at 25 degrees Celsius is 40.7 kg, this is equivalent to 1.38 ton of CO_{2}, which is more than the 1 ton of CO_{2} which would have been produced by incineration. In some countries, large amounts of landfill gas are collected. Still the global warming potential of the landfill gas emitted to atmosphere is significant. In the US it was estimated that the global warming potential of the emitted landfill gas in 1999 was approximately 32% higher than the amount of CO_{2} that would have been emitted by incineration. Since this study, the global warming potential estimate for methane has been increased from 21 to 35, which alone would increase this estimate to almost the triple GWP effect compared to incineration of the same waste.

In addition, nearly all biodegradable waste has biological origin. This material has been formed by plants using atmospheric CO_{2} typically within the last growing season. If these plants are regrown the CO_{2} emitted from their combustion will be taken out from the atmosphere once more.

Such considerations are the main reason why several countries administrate incineration of biodegradable waste as renewable energy. The rest – mainly plastics and other oil and gas derived products – is generally treated as non-renewables.

Different results for the CO_{2} footprint of incineration can be reached with different assumptions. Local conditions (such as limited local district heating demand, no fossil fuel generated electricity to replace or high levels of aluminium in the waste stream) can decrease the CO_{2} benefits of incineration. The methodology and other assumptions may also influence the results significantly. For example, the methane emissions from landfills occurring at a later date may be neglected or given less weight, or biodegradable waste may not be considered CO_{2} neutral. A study by Eunomia Research and Consulting in 2008 on potential waste treatment technologies in London demonstrated that by applying several of these (according to the authors) unusual assumptions the average existing incineration plants performed poorly for CO_{2} balance compared to the theoretical potential of other emerging waste treatment technologies.

==== Other emissions ====
Other gaseous emissions in the flue gas from incinerator furnaces include nitrogen oxides, sulfur dioxide, hydrochloric acid, heavy metals, and fine particles. Of the heavy metals, mercury is a major concern due to its toxicity and high volatility, as essentially all mercury in the municipal waste stream may exit in emissions if not removed by emission controls.

The steam content in the flue may produce visible fume from the stack, which can be perceived as a visual pollution. It may be avoided by decreasing the steam content by flue-gas condensation and reheating, or by increasing the flue gas exit temperature well above its dew point. Flue-gas condensation allows the latent heat of vaporization of the water to be recovered, subsequently increasing the thermal efficiency of the plant.

==== Flue-gas cleaning ====
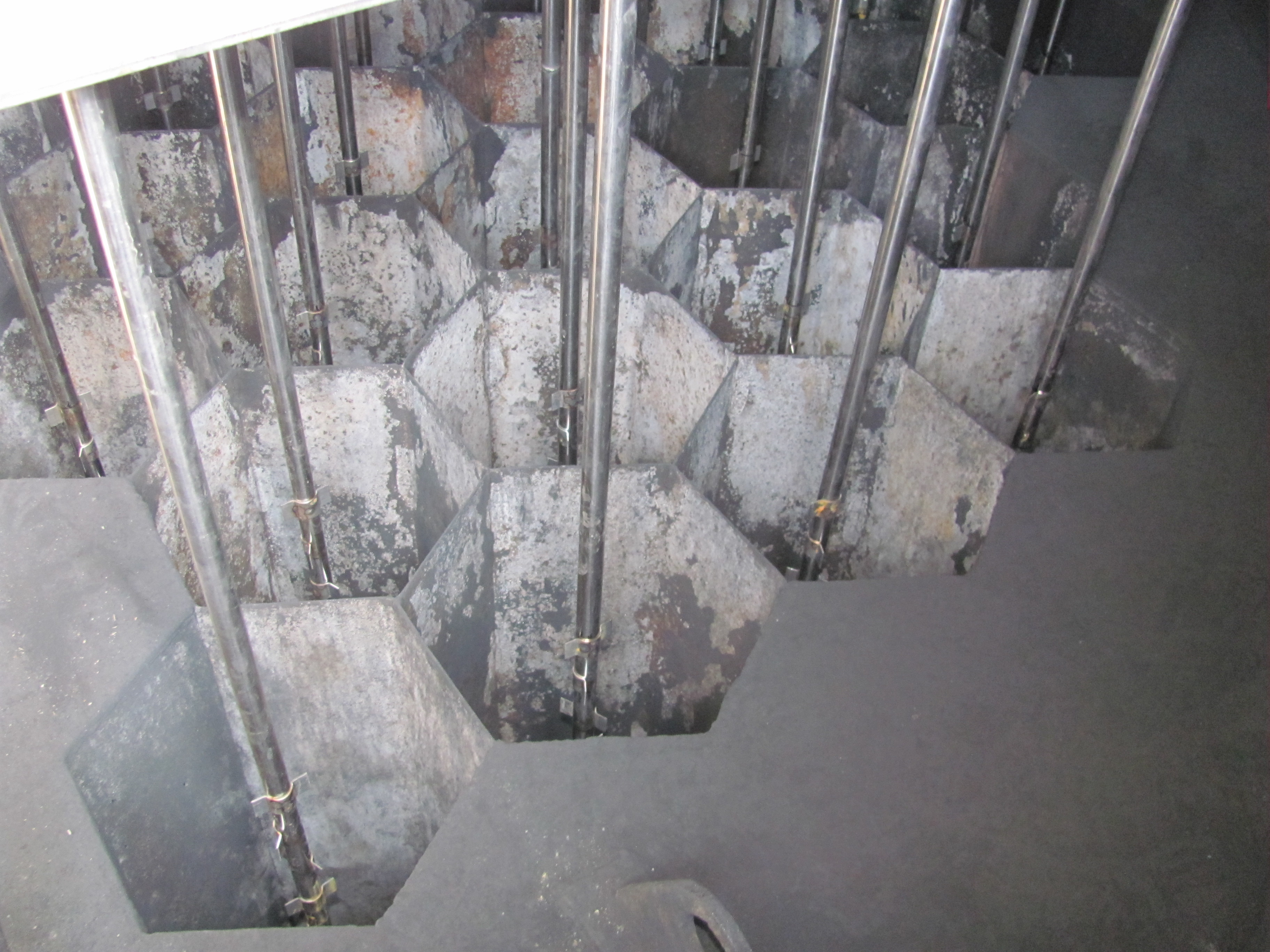
Electrodes inside electrostatic precipitator

The quantity of pollutants in the flue gas from incineration plants may or may not be reduced by several processes, depending on the plant.

Particulate is collected by particle filtration, most often electrostatic precipitators (ESP) and/or baghouse filters. The latter are generally very efficient for collecting fine particles. In an investigation by the Ministry of the Environment of Denmark in 2006, the average particulate emissions per energy content of incinerated waste from 16 Danish incinerators were below 2.02 g/GJ (grams per energy content of the incinerated waste). Detailed measurements of fine particles with sizes below 2.5 micrometres (PM_{2.5}) were performed on three of the incinerators: One incinerator equipped with an ESP for particle filtration emitted 5.3 g/GJ fine particles, while two incinerators equipped with baghouse filters emitted 0.002 and 0.013 g/GJ PM_{2.5}. For ultra fine particles (PM_{1.0}), the numbers were 4.889 g/GJ PM_{1.0} from the ESP plant, while emissions of 0.000 and 0.008 g/GJ PM_{1.0} were measured from the plants equipped with baghouse filters.

Acid gas scrubbers are used to remove hydrochloric acid, nitric acid, hydrofluoric acid, mercury, lead and other heavy metals. The efficiency of removal will depend on the specific equipment, the chemical composition of the waste, the design of the plant, the chemistry of reagents, and the ability of engineers to optimize these conditions, which may conflict for different pollutants. For example, mercury removal by wet scrubbers is considered coincidental and may be less than 50%. Basic scrubbers remove sulfur dioxide, forming gypsum by reaction with lime.

Waste water from scrubbers must subsequently pass through a waste water treatment plant.

Sulfur dioxide may also be removed by dry desulfurisation by injection limestone slurry into the flue gas before the particle filtration.

NO_{x} is either reduced by catalytic reduction with ammonia in a catalytic converter (selective catalytic reduction, SCR) or by a high-temperature reaction with ammonia in the furnace (selective non-catalytic reduction, SNCR). Urea may be substituted for ammonia as the reducing reagent but must be supplied earlier in the process so that it can hydrolyze into ammonia. Substitution of urea can reduce costs and potential hazards associated with storage of anhydrous ammonia.

Heavy metals are often adsorbed on injected active carbon powder, which is collected by particle filtration.

=== Solid outputs ===
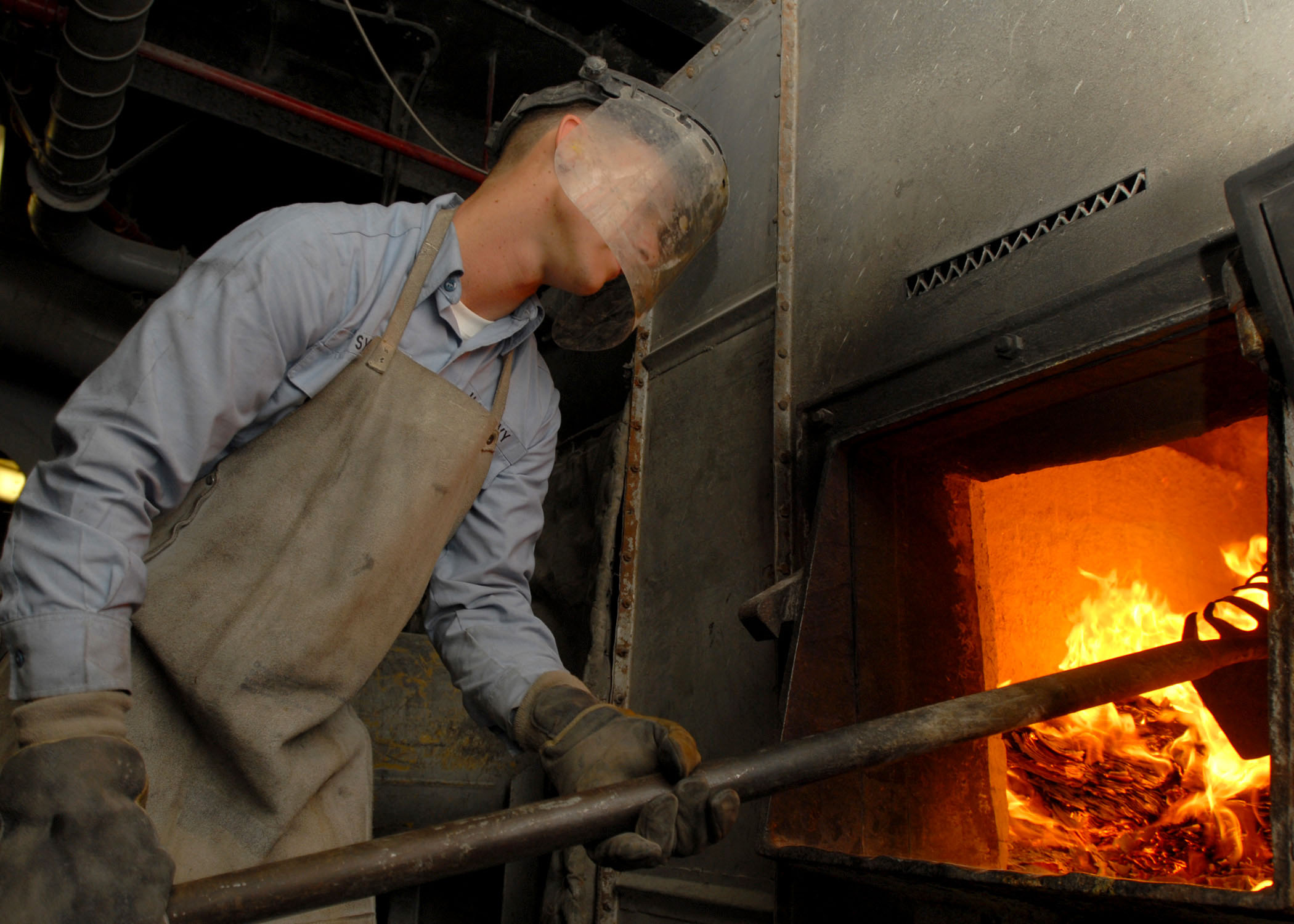
Operation of an incinerator aboard an aircraft carrier

Incineration produces fly ash and bottom ash just as is the case when coal is combusted. The total amount of ash produced by municipal solid waste incineration ranges from 4 to 10% by volume and 15–20% by weight of the original quantity of waste, and the fly ash amounts to about 10–20% of the total ash. The fly ash, by far, constitutes more of a potential health hazard than does the bottom ash because the fly ash often contain high concentrations of heavy metals such as lead, cadmium, copper and zinc as well as small amounts of dioxins and furans. The bottom ash seldom contain significant levels of heavy metals. At present although some historic samples tested by the incinerator operators' group would meet the being ecotoxic criteria at present the EA say "we have agreed" to regard incinerator bottom ash as "non-hazardous" until the testing programme is complete.

==== Processing and use of ashes ====
The bottom ash residue remaining after combustion has been shown to be a non-hazardous solid waste that can be safely put into landfills or recycled as construction aggregate. Samples are tested for ecotoxic metals.

=== Other pollution issues ===
Odor pollution can be a problem with old-style incinerators, but odors and dust are extremely well controlled in newer incineration plants. They receive and store the waste in an enclosed area with a negative pressure with the airflow being routed through the boiler which prevents unpleasant odors from escaping into the atmosphere. A study found that the strongest odor at an incineration facility in Eastern China occurred at its waste tipping port.

An issue that affects community relationships is the increased road traffic of waste collection vehicles to transport municipal waste to the incinerator. Due to this reason, most incinerators are located in industrial areas. This problem can be avoided to an extent through the transport of waste by rail from transfer stations.

=== Health effects ===
Scientific researchers have investigated the human health effects of pollutants produced by waste incineration. Many studies have examined health impacts from exposure to pollutants utilizing U.S. EPA modeling guidelines. Exposure through inhalation, ingestion, soil, and dermal contact are incorporated in these models. Research studies have also assessed exposure to pollutants through blood or urine samples of residents and workers who live near waste incinerators. Findings from a systematic review of previous research identified a number of symptoms and diseases related to incinerator pollution exposure. These include neoplasia, respiratory issues, congenital anomalies, and infant deaths or miscarriages. Populations near old, inadequately maintained incinerators experience a higher degree of health issues. Some studies also identified possible cancer risk. However, difficulties in separating incinerator pollution exposure from combined industry, motor vehicle, and agriculture pollution limits these conclusions on health risks.

Many communities have advocated for the improvement or removal of waste incinerator technology. Specific pollutant exposures, such as high levels of nitrogen dioxide, have been cited in community-led complaints relating to increased emergency room visits for respiratory issues. Potential health effects of waste incineration technology have been publicized, notably when located in communities already facing disproportionate health burdens. For example Wheelabrator Baltimore in Maryland has been investigated due to increased rates of asthma in its neighboring community, which is predominantly occupied by low-income, people of color. Community-led efforts have suggested a need for future research to address a lack of real-time pollution data. These sources have also cited a need for academic, government, and non-profit partnerships to better determine the health impacts of incineration.

== Debate ==
Use of incinerators for waste management is controversial. The debate over incinerators typically involves business interests (representing both waste generators and incinerator firms), government regulators, environmental activists and local citizens who must weigh the economic appeal of local industrial activity with their concerns over health and environmental risk.

People and organizations professionally involved in this issue include the U.S. Environmental Protection Agency and a great many local and national air quality regulatory agencies worldwide.

=== Arguments for incineration ===
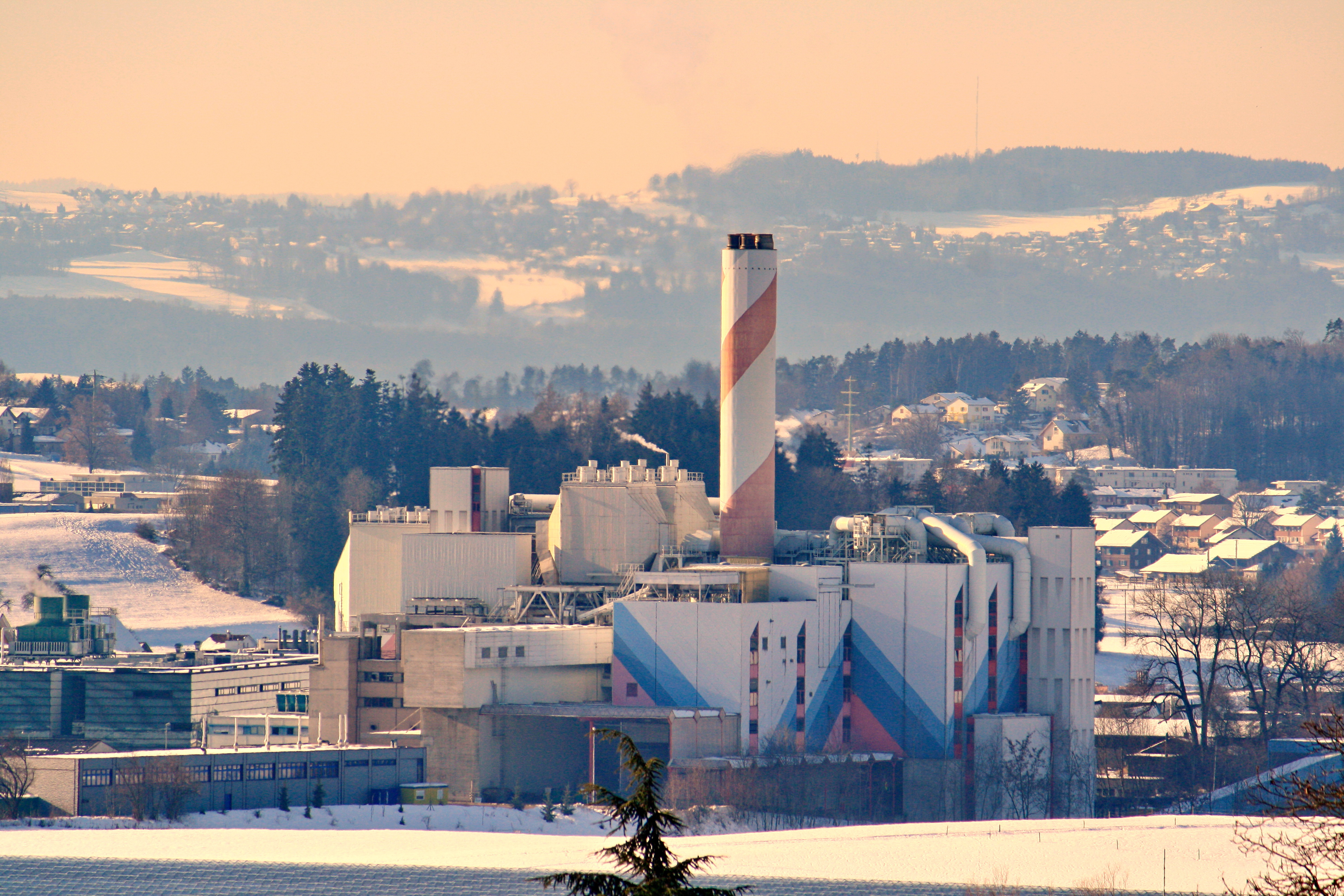
Kehrichtverbrennungsanlage Zürcher Oberland (KEZO) in Hinwil, Switzerland

==== Emissions ====
- The concerns over the health effects of dioxin and furan emissions have been significantly lessened by advances in emission control designs and very stringent new governmental regulations that have resulted in large reductions in the amount of dioxins and furans emissions.
- The UK Health Security Agency states that "modern, well run and regulated Municipal Waste Incinerators are not a significant risk to public health, as these incinerators only make a small contribution to local concentrations of air pollutants."
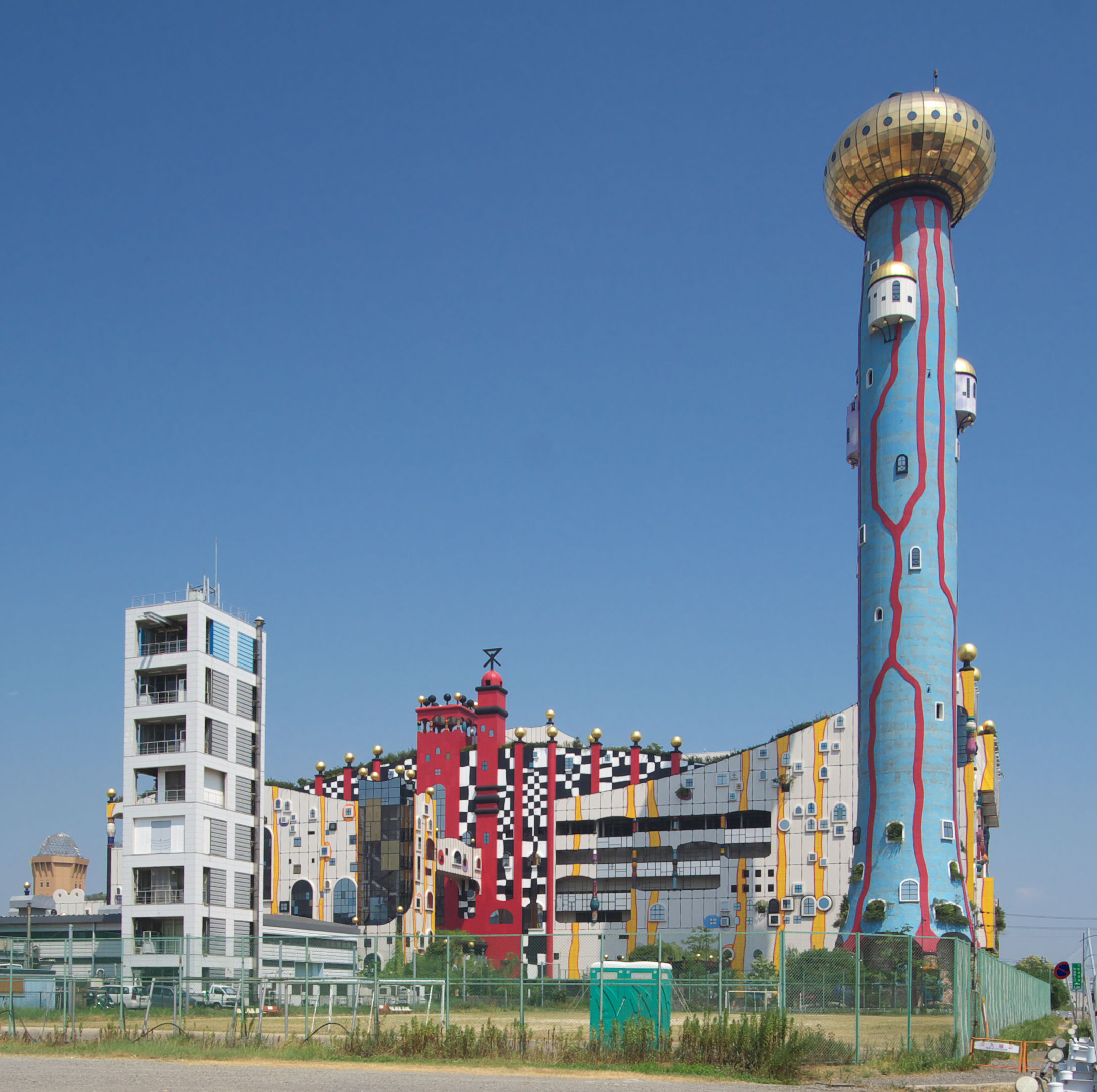
- The Maishima waste treatment center in Osaka, designed by Friedensreich Hundertwasser, uses heat for power generation.
  Fine particles can be efficiently removed from the flue gases with baghouse filters. Even though approximately 40% of the incinerated waste in Denmark was incinerated at plants with no baghouse filters, estimates based on measurements by the Danish Environmental Research Institute showed that incinerators (along with other co-generation plants) were only responsible for approximately 0.3% of the total domestic emissions of particulate smaller than 2.5 micrometres (PM_{2.5}) to the atmosphere in 2006.

===== Landfill interaction =====
- In densely populated areas, finding space for additional landfills is becoming increasingly difficult.
- Incineration of municipal solid waste avoids the release of methane. Every ton of MSW incinerated, prevents about one ton of carbon dioxide equivalents from being released to the atmosphere.
- Volume of combusted waste is reduced by approximately 90%, increasing the life of landfills. Ash from modern incinerators is vitrified (turned into glass) at temperatures of 1,000 °C (1,830 °F) to 1,100 °C (2,010 °F), reducing the leachability and toxicity of residue. As a result, special landfills are generally no longer required for incinerator ash from municipal waste streams, and existing landfills can see their life dramatically increased by combusting waste, reducing the need for municipalities to site and construct new landfills.

===== Recycling interaction =====
- Many municipalities that operate incineration facilities have higher recycling rates than neighboring cities and countries that do not send their waste to incinerators.. In Europe, the highest country incineration rates generally indicate also top recycling performance. Data from 2022 indicate that some exceptions like Slovenia and Latvia had reached very high recycling rates at lower incineration rates.
  - Material recovery from waste sent to incineration (e.g. metals and construction aggregate) is per definition not counted as recycling in European targets. The recovery of glass, stone and ceramic materials reused in construction, as well as ferrous and in some cases non-ferrous metals recovered from combustion residue thus adds further to the actual recycled amounts. Metals recovered from ash would typically be difficult or impossible to recycle through conventional means, as the removal of attached combustible material through incineration provides an alternative to labor- or energy-intensive mechanical separation methods.

==== Power ====
- Incineration plants can generate electricity and heat that can substitute power plants powered by other fuels at the regional electric and district heating grid, and steam supply for industrial customers. Incinerators and other waste-to-energy plants generate at least partially biomass-based renewable energy that offsets greenhouse gas pollution from coal-, oil- and gas-fired power plants. The E.U. considers energy generated from biogenic waste (waste with biological origin) by incinerators as non-fossil renewable energy under its emissions caps. These greenhouse gas reductions are in addition to those generated by the avoidance of methane if compared to landfilling of untreated waste (without gas capture), which is effectively banned in the E.U.

=== Arguments against incineration ===
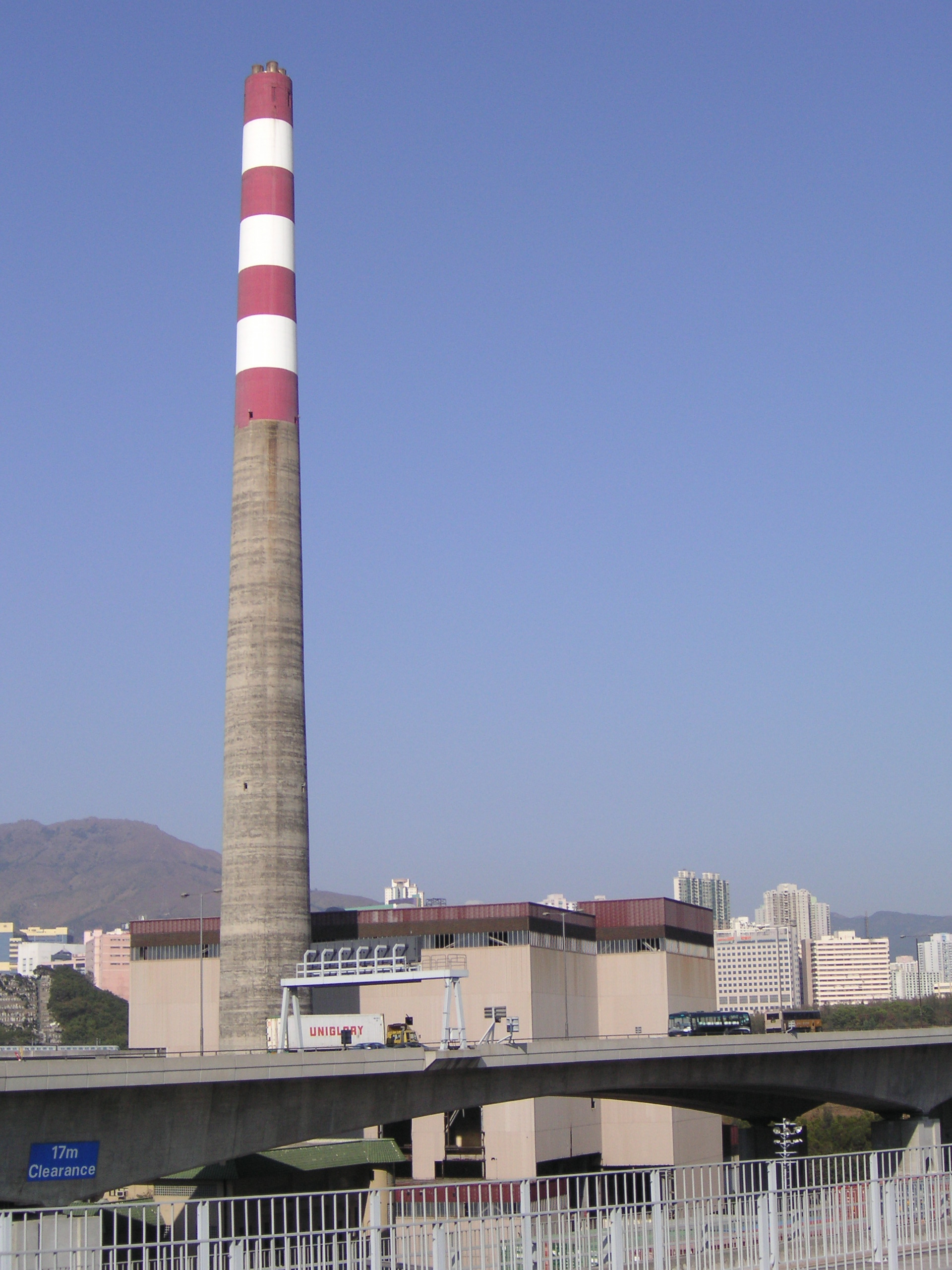
Decommissioned Kwai Chung Incineration Plant from 1978. It was demolished by February 2009.

==== Emissions ====
- The Scottish Protection Agency's (SEPA) comprehensive health effects research concluded "inconclusively" on health effects in October 2009. The authors stress, that even though no conclusive evidence of non-occupational health effects from incinerators were found in the existing literature, "small but important effects might be virtually impossible to detect". The report highlights epidemiological deficiencies in previous UK health studies and suggests areas for future studies. The U.K. Health Protection Agency produced a less critical summary in September 2009. Many toxicologists criticise and dispute this report as not being comprehensive epidemiologically, thin on peer review and the effects of fine particle effects on health.
- The health effects of dioxin and furan emissions from old incinerators; especially during start up and shut down, or where filter bypass is required continue to be a problem.
- Incinerators emit varying levels of heavy metals such as vanadium, manganese, chromium, nickel, arsenic, mercury, lead and cadmium, which can be toxic at very minute levels.
- Incinerators produce fine particles in the furnace. Even with modern particle filtering of the flue gases, a small part of these is emitted to the atmosphere. PM_{2.5} is not separately regulated in the European Waste Incineration Directive, even though they are repeatedly correlated spatially to infant mortality in the UK (M. Ryan's ONS data based maps around the EfW/CHP waste incinerators at Edmonton, Coventry, Chineham, Kirklees and Sheffield). Under WID there is no requirement to monitor stack top or downwind incinerator PM_{2.5} levels. Several European doctors associations (including cross discipline experts such as physicians, environmental chemists and toxicologists) in June 2008 representing over 33,000 doctors wrote a keynote statement directly to the European Parliament citing widespread concerns on incinerator particle emissions and the absence of specific fine and ultrafine particle size monitoring or in depth industry/government epidemiological studies of these minute and invisible incinerator particle size emissions.

===== Landfill interaction =====
- Combustion produces ash concentrates ecotoxic heavy metals from waste into ash, mostly the fly ash component. This ash must be stored in specialized landfills. The less toxic bottom ash (incinerator bottom ash, IBA) can be encased into concrete as a building material, but there is a risk of hydrogen gas explosion due to the aluminum content. The UK Highway Authority put the use of IBA in foam concrete on hold as it investigates a series of explosions in 2009. Recovery of useful metals from ash is a new but even less mature approach.

==== Alternative technologies ====
- Alternative technologies are available or in development such as mechanical biological treatment, anaerobic digestion (MBT/AD), autoclaving or mechanical heat treatment (MHT) using steam or plasma arc gasification (PGP), which is incineration using electrically produced extreme high temperatures, or combinations of these treatments.
- Erection of incinerators compete with the development and introduction of other emerging technologies. A UK government WRAP report, August 2008 found that in the UK median incinerator costs per ton were generally higher than those for MBT treatments by £18 per metric ton; and £27 per metric ton for most modern (post 2000) incinerators.
- A 2008 Eunomia report found that under some circumstances and assumptions, incineration causes less CO_{2} reduction than other emerging EfW and CHP technology combinations for treating residual mixed waste. The authors found that CHP incinerator technology without waste recycling ranked 19 out of 24 combinations (where all alternatives to incineration were combined with advanced waste recycling plants); being 228% less efficient than the ranked 1 Advanced MBT maturation technology; or 211% less efficient than plasma gasification/autoclaving combination ranked 2.

==== Social and economical factors ====
- Building and operating waste processing plants such as incinerators requires long contract periods to recover initial investment costs, causing a long-term lock-in. Incinerator lifetimes normally range from 25 to 30 years. This was highlighted by Peter Jones, OBE, the Mayor of London's waste representative in April 2009.
- Local communities are often opposed to the idea of locating waste processing plants such as incinerators in their vicinity (the Not in My Back Yard phenomenon). Studies in Andover, Massachusetts correlated 10% property devaluations with close incinerator proximity.
- Some incinerators are visually undesirable. In many countries they require a visually intrusive chimney stack.
- If reusable waste fractions are handled in waste processing plants such as incinerators in developing nations, it would cut out viable work for local economies. It is estimated that there are 1 million people making a livelihood off collecting waste.
- The reduced levels of emissions from municipal waste incinerators and waste to energy plants from historical peaks are largely the product of the proficient use of emission control technology. Emission controls add to the initial and operational expenses. It should not be assumed that all new plants will employ the best available control technology if not required by law.

==== Alternative handling of trash ====
- Prevention, waste minimisation, reuse and recycling of waste should all be preferred to incineration according to the waste hierarchy. Supporters of zero waste consider incinerators and other waste treatment technologies as barriers to recycling and separation beyond particular levels, and that waste resources are sacrificed for energy production.
- Waste that has been deposited on a landfill can be mined even decades and centuries later, and recycled with future technologies – which is not the case with incineration.

== Trends in incinerator use ==
The history of municipal solid waste (MSW) incineration is linked intimately to the history of landfills and other waste treatment technology. The merits of incineration are inevitably judged in relation to the alternatives available. Since the 1970s, recycling and other prevention measures have changed the context for such judgements. Since the 1990s alternative waste treatment technologies have been maturing and becoming viable.

Incineration is a key process in the treatment of hazardous wastes and clinical wastes. It is often imperative that medical waste be subjected to the high temperatures of incineration to destroy pathogens and toxic contamination it contains.

=== In North America ===
The first incinerator in the U.S. was built in 1885 on Governors Island in New York. In 1949, Robert C. Ross founded one of the first hazardous waste management companies in the U.S. He began Robert Ross Industrial Disposal because he saw an opportunity to meet the hazardous waste management needs of companies in northern Ohio. In 1958, the company built one of the first hazardous waste incinerators in the U.S.

The first full-scale, municipally operated incineration facility in the U.S. was the Arnold O. Chantland Resource Recovery Plant built in 1975 in Ames, Iowa. The plant is still in operation and produces refuse-derived fuel that is sent to local power plants for fuel. The first commercially successful incineration plant in the U.S. was built in Saugus, Massachusetts, in October 1975 by Wheelabrator Technologies, and is still in operation today.

There are several environmental or waste management corporations that transport ultimately to an incinerator or cement kiln treatment center. Currently (2009), there are three main businesses that incinerate waste: Clean Harbours, WTI-Heritage, and Ross Incineration Services. Clean Harbours has acquired many of the smaller, independently run facilities, accumulating 5–7 incinerators in the process across the U.S. WTI-Heritage has one incinerator, located in the southeastern corner of Ohio across the Ohio River from West Virginia.

Several old generation incinerators have been closed; of the 186 MSW incinerators in 1990, only 89 remained by 2007, and of the 6200 medical waste incinerators in 1988, only 115 remained in 2003. No new incinerators were built between 1996 and 2007. The main reasons for lack of activity have been:

- Economics. With the increase in the number of large inexpensive regional landfills and, up until recently, the relatively low price of electricity, incinerators were not able to compete for the 'fuel', i.e., waste in the U.S.
- Tax policies. Tax credits for plants producing electricity from waste were rescinded in the U.S. between 1990 and 2004.

There has been renewed interest in incineration and other waste-to-energy technologies in the U.S. and Canada. In the U.S., incineration was granted qualification for renewable energy production tax credits in 2004. Projects to add capacity to existing plants are underway, and municipalities are once again evaluating the option of building incineration plants rather than continue landfilling municipal wastes. However, many of these projects have faced continued political opposition in spite of renewed arguments for the greenhouse gas benefits of incineration and improved air pollution control and ash recycling.

=== In Europe ===
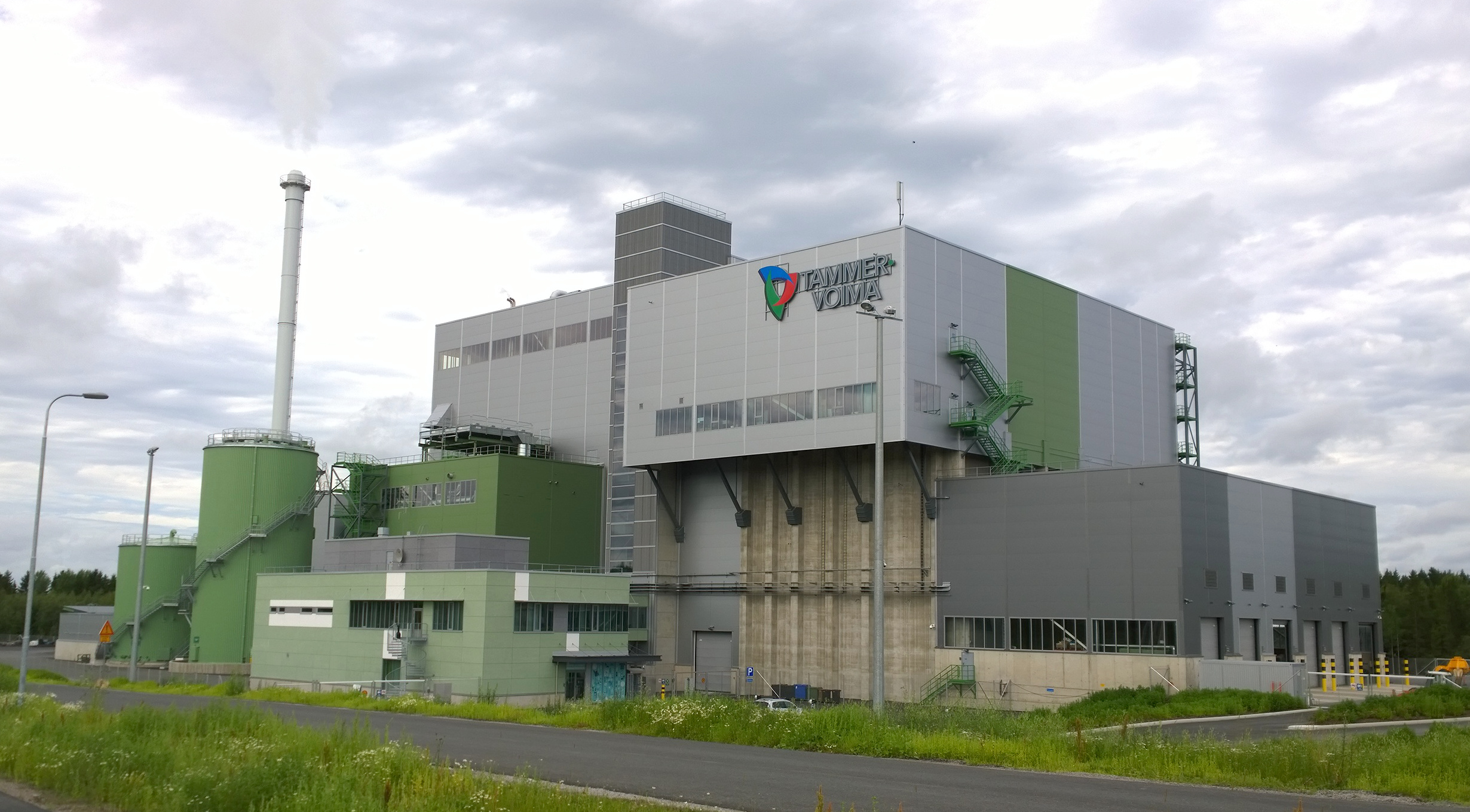
The Tarastejärvi Incineration Plant in Taraste, Tampere, Finland

In Europe, as a result of a ban on landfilling untreated waste, many incinerators have been built in the last decade, with more under construction. Recently, a number of municipal governments have begun the process of contracting for the construction and operation of incinerators. In Europe, some of the electricity generated from waste is deemed to be from a 'Renewable Energy Source' (RES) and is thus eligible for tax credits if privately operated. Also, some incinerators in Europe are equipped with waste recovery, allowing the reuse of ferrous and non-ferrous materials found in the burned waste. A prominent example is the AEB Waste Fired Power Plant, Amsterdam.

In Sweden, about 50% of the generated waste is burned in waste-to-energy facilities, producing electricity and supplying local cities' district heating systems. The importance of waste in Sweden's electricity generation scheme is reflected on their 2,700,000 tons of waste imported per year (in 2014) to supply waste-to-energy facilities.

Due to increasing targets for municipal solid waste recycling in the EU, at least 55% by 2025 up to 65% by 2035, several traditional incineration countries are at risk of not meeting them, since at most 35% will remain available for thermal treatment and disposal. Denmark has since decided to reduce its incineration capacity by 30% by 2030.

Incineration of non-hazardous waste was not included as a form of green investment in the EU taxonomy for sustainable activities due to concerns about harming the circularity agenda, effectively stopping future EU funding to the municipal solid waste incineration sector.

=== In the United Kingdom ===
The technology employed in the UK waste management industry has been greatly lagging behind that of Europe due to the wide availability of landfills. The Landfill Directive set down by the European Union led to the Government of the United Kingdom imposing waste legislation including the landfill tax and Landfill Allowance Trading Scheme. This legislation is designed to reduce the release of greenhouse gases produced by landfills through the use of alternative methods of waste treatment. It is the UK Government's position that incineration will play an increasingly large role in the treatment of municipal waste and supply of energy in the UK.

In 2008, plans for potential incinerator locations exists for approximately 100 sites. These have been interactively mapped by UK NGOs.

Under a new plan, in June 2012, a DEFRA-backed grant scheme (The Farming and Forestry Improvement Scheme) was set up to encourage the use of low-capacity incinerators on agricultural sites to improve their bio security.

A permit has recently been granted for what would be the UK's largest waste incinerator in the centre of the Cambridge – Milton Keynes – Oxford corridor, in Bedfordshire. Following the construction of a large incinerator at Greatmoor in Buckinghamshire, and plans to construct a further one near Bedford, the Cambridge – Milton Keynes – Oxford corridor will become a major incineration hub in the UK.

=== In Asia ===
Incinerators have been used in Asian countries, especially in those that face land scarcity. Asian countries are densely populated and face shortages in available space for landfill. They are used in China, Japan, South Korea, Vietnam, Thailand, Indonesia, Philippines, Malaysia and India.

In Japan, incinerators are built with central government subsidies to manage their waste. The Maishima Incineration Plant in Osaka built in 2001 processes 900 Tons of garbage daily and produces 32,000 kW of power

== Mobile incinerators ==
=== Incineration units for emergency use ===
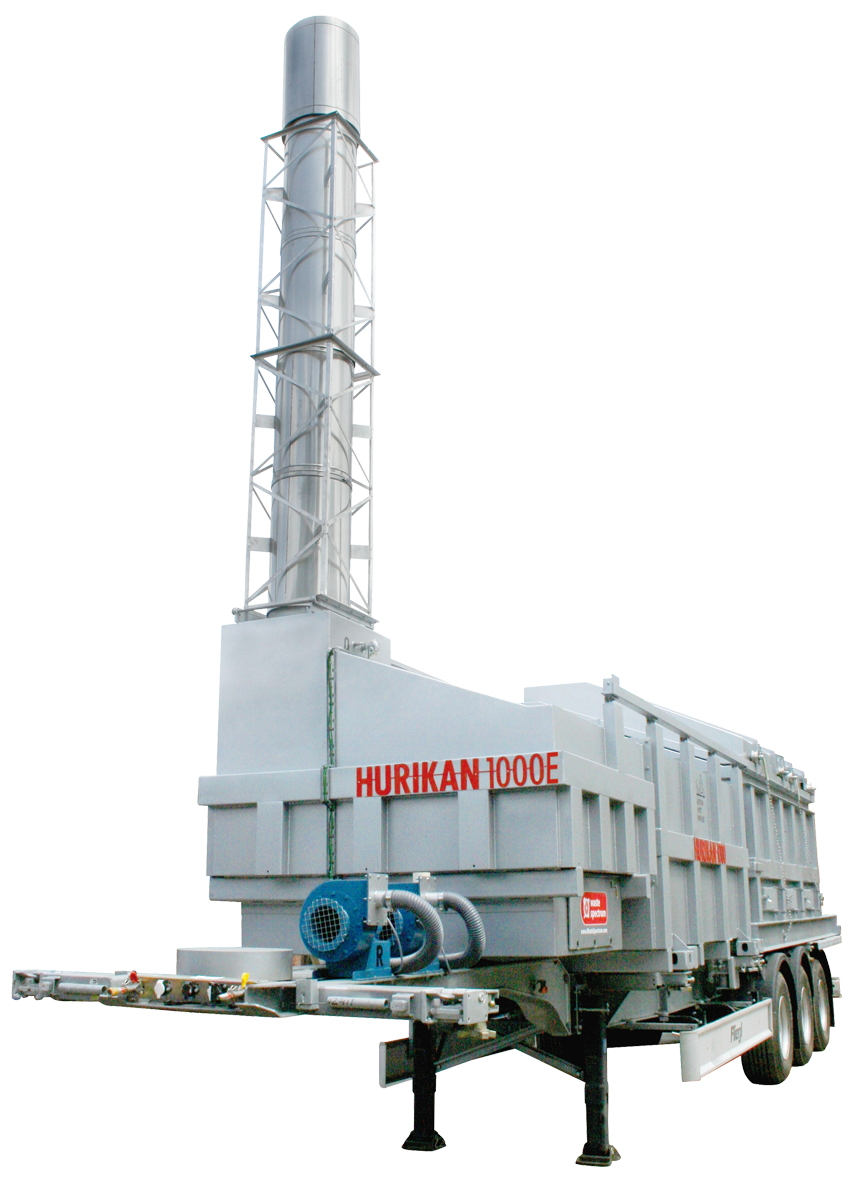
Mobile incineration unit for emergency use

Emergency incineration systems exist for the urgent and biosecure disposal of animals and their by-products following a mass mortality or disease outbreak. An increase in regulation and enforcement from governments and institutions worldwide has been forced through public pressure and significant economic exposure.

Contagious animal disease has cost governments and industry $200 billion over 20 years to 2012 and is responsible for over 65% of infectious disease outbreaks worldwide in the past sixty years. One-third of global meat exports (approx 6 million tonnes) is affected by trade restrictions at any time and as such the focus of Governments, public bodies and commercial operators is on cleaner, safer and more robust methods of animal carcass disposal to contain and control disease.

Large-scale incineration systems are available from niche suppliers and are often bought by governments as a safety net in case of contagious outbreak. Many are mobile and can be quickly deployed to locations requiring biosecure disposal.

=== Small incinerator units ===
An example of a low capacity, mobile incinerator

Small-scale incinerators exist for special purposes. For example, mobile small-scale incinerators are aimed for hygienically safe destruction of medical waste in developing countries. Companies such as Inciner8, a UK based company, are a good example of mobile incinerator manufacturers with their I8-M50 and I8-M70 models. Small incinerators can be quickly deployed to remote areas where an outbreak has occurred to dispose of infected animals quickly and without the risk of cross contamination.

=== Containerised incinerator units ===
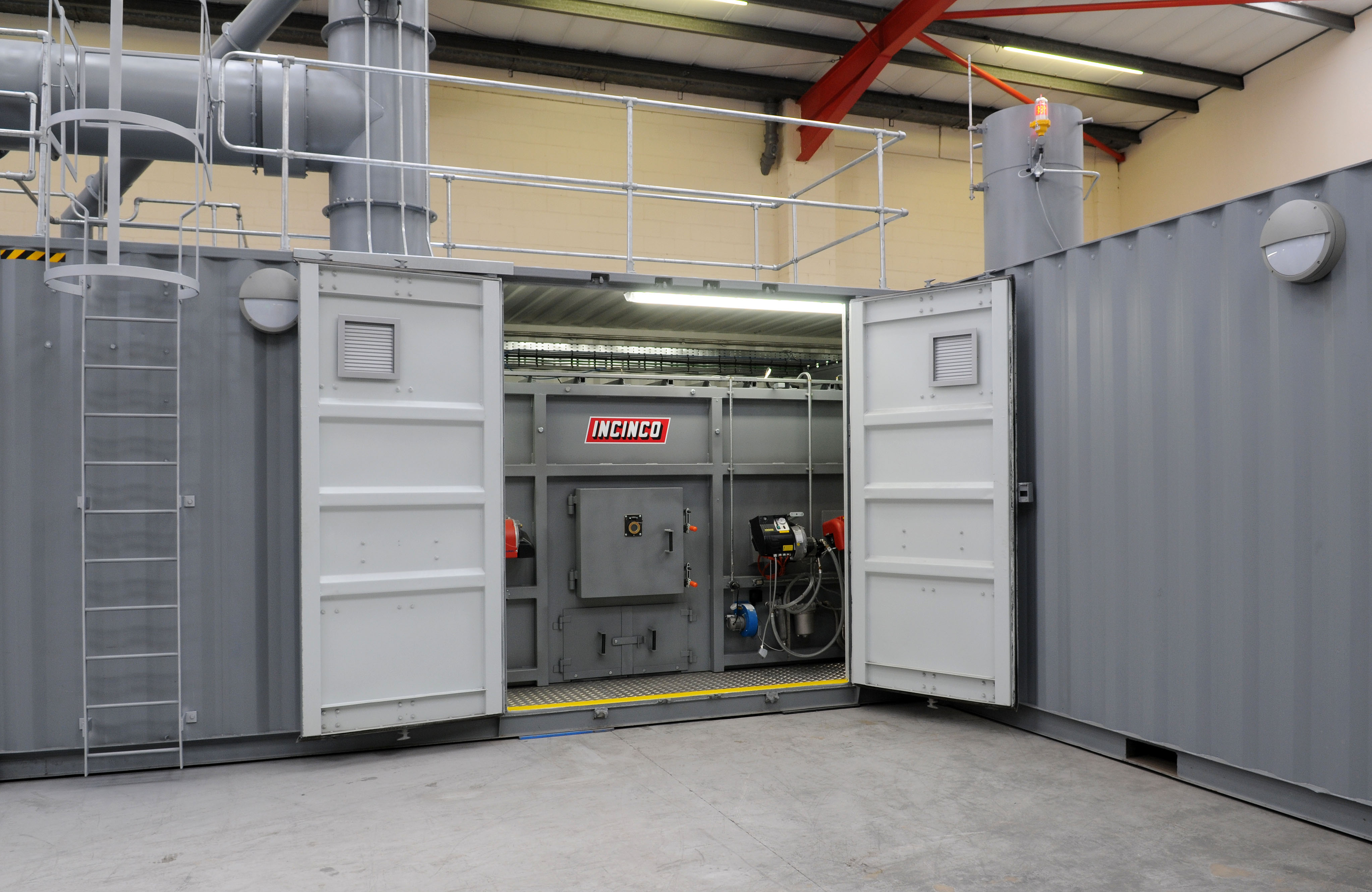
An example of a containerised waste incinerator-Incinco

Containerised incinerators are a unique type of incinerator that are specifically designed to function in remote locations where traditional infrastructure may not be available. These incinerators are typically built within a shipping container for easy transport and installation.

== See also ==
- Burn pit
- Cremation
- Exposure assessment
- Gasification
- Incinerating toilet
- List of solid waste treatment technologies
- Open burning of waste
- Plasma gasification
- Pyrolysis
- Thermal oxidizer
- Thermal treatment
- Waste Incineration Directive
- Waste management
- Waste-to-energy
- Zero waste
