= Jason Motte =

American baseball player (born 1982)

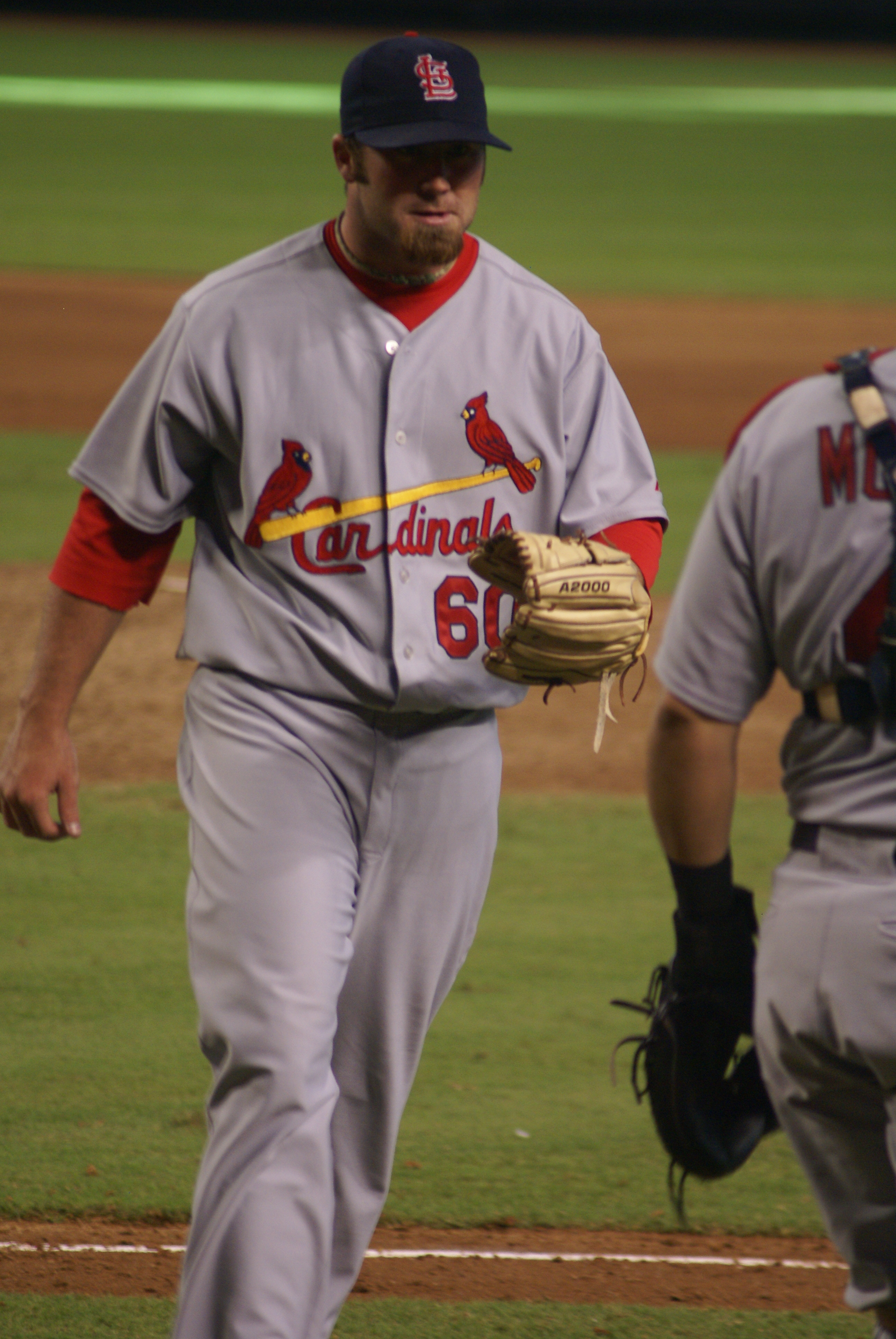
- Motte with the St. Louis Cardinals in 2008
- Pitcher
- Born: June 22, 1982 (age 44); Port Huron, Michigan, U.S.
- Batted: Right Threw: Right

MLB debut
- September 3, 2008, for the St. Louis Cardinals

Last MLB appearance
- October 1, 2017, for the Atlanta Braves

MLB statistics
- Win–loss record: 27–15
- Earned run average: 3.30
- Strikeouts: 375
- Saves: 60
- Stats at Baseball Reference

Teams
- St. Louis Cardinals (2008–2012, 2014); Chicago Cubs (2015); Colorado Rockies (2016); Atlanta Braves (2017)

Career highlights and awards
- World Series champion (2011); NL saves leader (2012)

Jason Louis Motte (born June 22, 1982) is an American former professional baseball pitcher. He played in Major League Baseball (MLB) for the St. Louis Cardinals, Chicago Cubs, Colorado Rockies, and Atlanta Braves. The Cardinals drafted him as a catcher in 2003 and he converted to pitching in 2006. Motte played a key role in the 2011 World Series championship run, saving five postseason games. In 2012, he led the National League (NL) in saves with 42. Motte had Tommy John surgery to repair an ulnar collateral ligament injury that kept him from playing all of 2013. After returning to the Cardinals midway through the 2014 season, Motte signed a one-year, $4.5 million deal with the Cubs for 2015.

== Early life and amateur career ==
Motte was born in Port Huron, Michigan. His father, James, worked for Wheelabrator Technologies and moved the family around several times during Motte's childhood including stops in Shreveport, Louisiana, Shelton, Connecticut, Pueblo, Colorado, Pensacola, Florida and, ultimately, Montgomery, New York.

He graduated from Valley Central High School in Montgomery in 2000 and played catcher on the varsity baseball team. Valley Central is also the alma mater of former MLB pitcher Matt Morris. He then attended Iona College in New Rochelle, New York. At Iona, Motte could throw to second base from behind the plate as fast as 1.76 seconds, and was clocked at throwing 85 mph from this position. While Motte never pitched for Iona, the school's pitching coach reported that, with shinguards on, Motte once released a 94 mph pitch from the mound at practice. Despite his arm strength, Motte never threw a single pitch in a game in either high school or college.

== Professional career ==
=== Draft and minor leagues: Catcher (2003–2008) ===
Cardinals selected Motte in the 19th round of the 2003 Major League Baseball draft as a catcher. In 2003 with the Peoria Chiefs, in 48 games at catcher he committed four errors with five passed balls. Early in his minor league career, he struggled as a hitter. He batted .222 in 2003, .175 in 2004, and .176 in 2005. On June 29, 2005, Motte went on the disabled list (DL) for a thumb fracture while playing for the High-A Palm Beach Cardinals. Entering the 2006 season, Motte had compiled a .188 career batting average. He also had just 21 walks, 13 doubles and four home runs in 209 minor league games as a catcher. However, his arm strength and accuracy were difficult to ignore. Motte threw out 53 of 109 would-be base stealers for a 49% rate. He also recorded 160 assists in his first 181 games. Spurred by the thumb injury, declining batting average, and conspicuous throwing abilities, Motte converted to pitching.

=== Conversion to pitcher: 2006 ===
The results as a pitcher showed much more promise than attempting to become a Major League hitter. Between State College and Quad Cities in 2006, Motte pitched his first 39 professional innings. He struck out 38 batters and posted a 3.69 earned run average while allowing 10.6 hits per nine innings pitched. The next season, he improved across the board. Between Palm Beach and Springfield, he totaled 59 innings, 69 strikeouts, a 1.98 ERA, and 6.6 hits per nine innings. That performance made him one of the Cardinals' top pitching prospects and the Cardinals added him to their 40-man roster in early December 2007 to avoid exposing him to the Rule 5 draft.

Motte spent the majority of the 2008 season with the Memphis Redbirds, the St. Louis Cardinals' Triple-A farm team in the Pacific Coast League. His abilities as strikeout pitcher became even more prominent: in 66 2/3 innings, he struck out 110, a rate of 14.8 strikeouts per nine innings pitched.

=== St. Louis Cardinals (2008–2014) ===
==== 2008–11 ====
The Cardinals called Motte from the minor leagues on September 2, 2008. He recorded a total of 12 appearances, all in relief, with an ERA of 0.82 in his first month in the big leagues. In 11 innings, Motte struck out 16 batters, allowing three walks and five hits. He earned his first save on September 18 against Cincinnati in their ballpark, getting the final out in the ninth inning with a fly ball to left field.

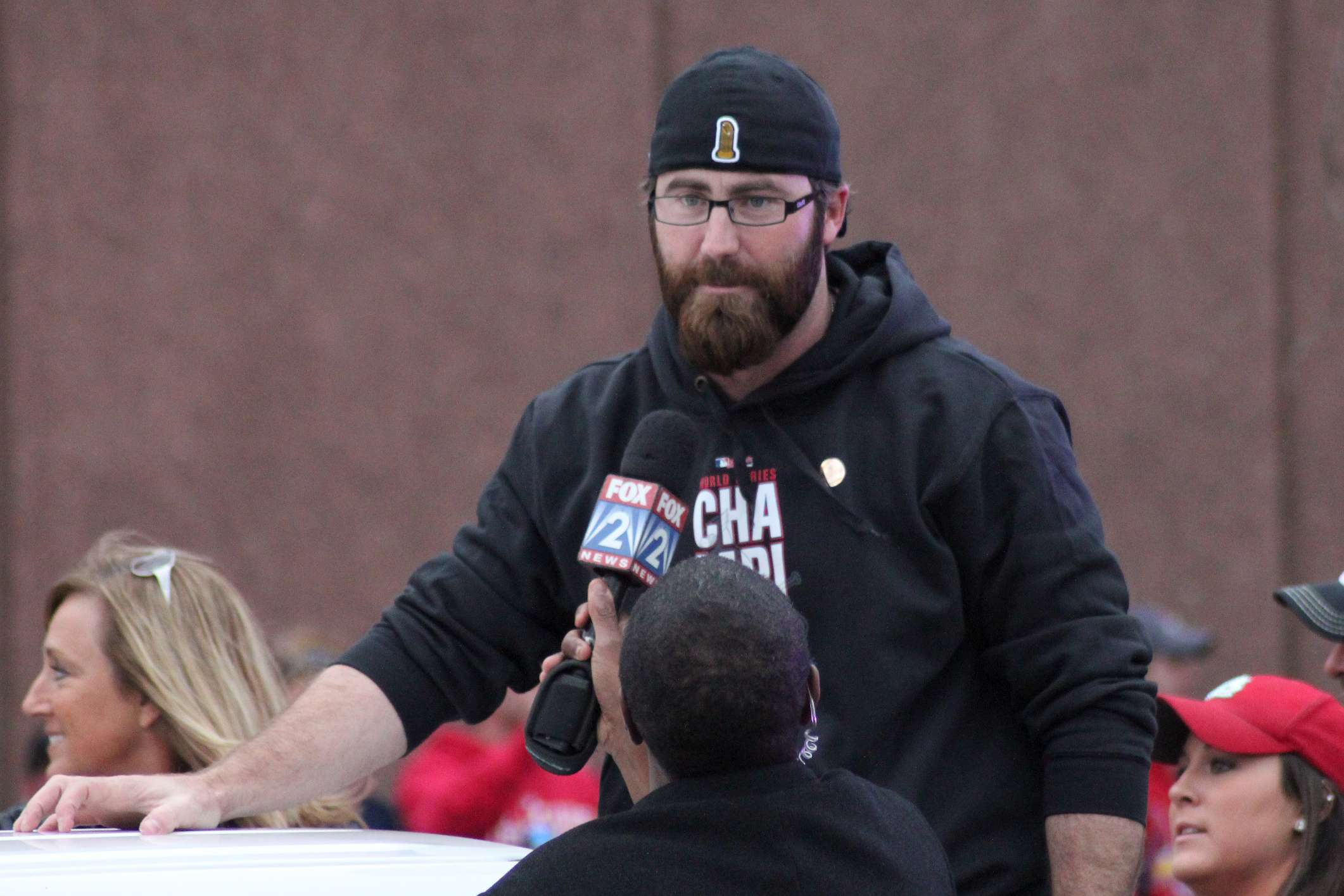
Motte during the 2011 World Series Parade.

During the 2009 spring training camp, Motte competed with Ryan Franklin and Chris Perez in an attempt to earn the role as the Cardinals' 2009 closer; manager Tony La Russa later said he would not establish a closer. Instead, he would use a mix of relievers in the ninth inning. Motte was called on to save the first game. However, he gave up four runs to the Pittsburgh Pirates in the ninth inning. Pittsburgh won 6–4. After this blown save opportunity, La Russa moved Motte into a middle reliever role. Despite the blown the save on opening day and occasional rough outings that contributed to a 4.59 ERA, Motte recorded 14 holds. Motte became the Cardinals' de facto closer late in the 2011 season – La Russa still had not named him as the closer – helping his team win the Wild Card. Motte pitched in two games against the Philadelphia Phillies in the 2011 National League Division Series (NLDS), in which the Cardinals won the series 3 games to 2. Motte also pitched in three games in the 2011 National League Championship Series (NLCS) against St. Louis' division rival, the Milwaukee Brewers. The Cardinals won this series in six games. Motte was on the mound for the final out of the NLCS winning the Cardinals their 18th pennant. He was also on the mound when the Cardinals defeated the Texas Rangers in the World Series.

==== 2012 ====
He won the NL Player of the Week Award for the first time for his week of September 17–23, after picking up his fifth consecutive save out of five opportunities and league-leading 40th. Motte finished the season with 2.75 ERA and 91 strikeouts in 76 innings, along with a National League-leading 42 saves. Motte is one of five pitchers in Cardinals history to reach 40 or more saves, joining Hall of Fame pitchers Lee Smith and Bruce Sutter, as well as Jason Isringhausen and Trevor Rosenthal.

==== 2013 ====
On January 22, 2013, the St. Louis Cardinals reached a two-year contract with Motte, the financial details of which were not disclosed. The deal effectively bought out the final two years of Motte's arbitration eligibility. At the end of the contract he became a free agent. Motte earned $1.95 million in 2012 and had filed for a salary of $5.5 million for 2013. The Cardinals' counter-offer was reported as $4.5 million.

On March 29, 2013, the Cardinals placed Motte on the DL with a strained elbow. He and the team physician at first hoped that non-surgical rehab treatment could allow him to still pitch at some point in 2013. However, on May 3, the Cardinals announced that Motte would undergo season-ending Tommy John surgery to repair a torn ligament in his elbow.

Manager Mike Matheny called upon Edward Mujica to replace Motte as closer. Eventually, rookie Trevor Rosenthal replaced Mujica by season's end and saved four games in the Cardinals' NL pennant-winning playoffs. Like Adam Wainwright and Chris Carpenter before him – both of whom also rehabilitated through Tommy John surgery – Motte made himself available for the Cardinals relievers during games, especially for the rookies and inexperienced relievers. After the World Series, with Motte still recovering and Rosenthal's convincing finish as closer, Matheny announced Rosenthal would be the closer for 2014. Meanwhile, Motte continued to progress and was throwing off a mound by November. Due to Motte availing himself to the other Cardinals pitchers even while he was unable to pitch, his teammates voted for him to receive the Darryl Kile Good Guy Award. He is the first player to receive the award while not making a single game appearance in the season for which he was awarded.

==== 2014 ====
On May 21, Motte made his return to the mound after missing 2013, pitching 1 1/3 innings of scoreless relief. However, he struggled for the rest of the season and was ultimately left off the Cardinals' postseason roster. In 29 games he was 1-0 with a 4.68 ERA. He became a free agent after they were eliminated by the San Francisco Giants.

In six seasons with the Cardinals, Motte was 18-13 with 54 saves and a 3.03 ERA with 290 strikeouts in 285 innings. He became a free agent following the season.

=== Chicago Cubs (2015) ===
On December 16, 2014, Motte and the Chicago Cubs agreed to a 1-year, $4.5 million contract. In 57 games with the Cubs in 2015, Motte was 8-1 with a 3.91 ERA and six saves. He became a free agent following the season.

=== Colorado Rockies (2016) ===
On December 8, 2015, Motte signed a two-year, $10 million contract with the Colorado Rockies. In 2016 for the Rockies, in 30 games he was 0-1 with a 4.94 ERA. He was designated for assignment on March 31, 2017, to create room for Stephen Cardullo who had his contract purchased, and released on April 5.

=== Atlanta Braves (2017) ===
On April 9, 2017, Motte signed a minor league deal with the Atlanta Braves. He was called up on April 27 and had a 3.54 ERA in 46 games with 27 strikeouts in 40 innings. He became a free agent following the season.

=== Return to St. Louis (2018) ===
On February 16, 2018, Motte signed a minor league deal to return to the Cardinals, reuniting him with the team that drafted him. He was given an invite to spring training but was released by the Cardinals on March 22.

In nine major league seasons, Motte was 27-15 with 60 saves and a 3.30 ERA in 444 career games. In 19 career postseason games, all with the Cardinals, Motte was 1-1 with a 2.08 ERA and eight saves.

== Coaching career ==
On June 15, 2018, he joined the University of Memphis coaching staff, although he did not formally announce his retirement. In February 2022, he was named the head baseball coach at Christian Brothers High School in Memphis.

== Pitching profile ==
Motte's primary pitch is a four-seam fastball, which was clocked in the upper 90s during 2008. In 2012, it was clocked at 102 miles per hour (MPH). He also threw a cut fastball that reached 93 MPH and a sinking fastball that reached 96 MPH, and, rarely, an 85-MPH changeup. His cutter has shown the widest variance of movement of all his pitches, to being anywhere from flat vertically to moving up to eight inches. He also regularly threw a curveball through the 2010 season, but has discontinued it since last throwing it in 2011.

== Personal life ==
Motte is a Christian. Motte and his wife Caitlin have a daughter and a son. They reside in Memphis, where Motte has coached at the college and high school level. In part due to the traveling required for college baseball, he has currently serving as the head baseball coach at Christian Brothers High School in Memphis.

Motte's brother, James, played in the Minnesota Twins farm system.

The couple runs two foundations: the Jason Motte Foundation, and a cancer awareness foundation called "Strikeout Childhood Cancer." While recovering from Tommy John surgery in 2013, Motte disclosed that his encounters with numerous people stricken with cancer – from his grandfather to Cardinals fans, including many children – moved him to visit and encourage them. As a result, Motte and the Cardinals organized a pediatric cancer awareness day on September 23, 2013, to set aside 5,000 game tickets at the pavilion that cost $10.00 each, with $3.00 per ticket going to the Jason Motte Foundation. An additional 1,000 tickets were donated to pediatric cancer patients just released from the hospital. For those unable to go to Busch Stadium, Motte organized a group of several of his teammates to see the children in person.

== See also ==
- List of St. Louis Cardinals team records
- List of Major League Baseball annual saves leaders
