= Selective non-catalytic reduction =

Process to reduce nitrogen oxide emissions from power plants

Selective non-catalytic reduction (SNCR) is a method to lessen nitrogen oxide (NO_{x}) emissions downstream of a combustion process. Its conventional application is in power plants that burn fossil fuels, especially coal. It is now widely applied across many industries to treat flue gas from a variety of processes and combustion sources, including waste incineration, cement kilns, pulp and paper boilers, metallurgical blast furnaces, and oil refineries. The process involves injecting either ammonia or urea directly into the flue gas to react with the nitrogen oxides formed in the combustion process. The resulting products of the chemical redox reaction are molecular nitrogen (N_{2}), carbon dioxide (CO_{2}), and water (H_{2}O).

The conversion of noxious NO_{x} to innocuous N_{2} is described by the following simplified equation:

4 NO + 4 NH_{3} + O_{2} → 4 N_{2} + 6 H_{2}O

When urea is used, the pre-reaction occurs to first convert it to ammonia:

NH_{2}CONH_{2} + H_{2}O → 2 NH_{3} + CO_{2}

The ammonia then reacts with NO_{x} as shown in the first equation.

The reaction requires a sufficient reaction time within a certain temperature range, typically between 1,400 and 2,000 °F (760 and 1,090 °C), to be effective. The NO_{x} reduction efficiency is the ratio of the amount of NO_{x} converted and the amount of reactant injected, and it is maximized when the reaction is at high temperatures, such as in the firebox of a boiler. For ammonia, the optimal temperature range is between 1,600–2,000 °F (870–1,090 °C), with peak removal usually occurring at 1,750 °F (950 °C). For urea, the optimal range is 1,650–2,100 °F (900–1,150 °C), with peak removal usually occurring at 1,850 °F (1,010 °C).

At lower temperatures the nitrogen monoxide (NO) and the ammonia do not react. Ammonia that has not reacted is called ammonia slip and is generally undesirable, as ammonia itself is a harmful pollutant. Excess ammonia can also react with other combustion byproduct species, such as sulfur trioxide (SO_{3}), to form ammonium salts.

At temperatures above 2,000 °F (1,090 °C) ammonia oxidizes:

4 NH_{3} + 5 O_{2} -> 4 NO + 6 H_{2}O

In this case, NO is produced instead of being removed, which is generally undesirable.

When the reactant is injected directly into a reaction vessel, such as a boiler, mixing dynamics within the vessel can lead to further complications for NO_{x} control. In a combustion process, NO_{x} is mainly produced through two mechanisms: the oxidation of nitrogen-containing compounds in the combustion fuel, and the direct reaction of elemental nitrogen (N_{2}) with elemental oxygen (O_{2}) at high temperatures. In a reaction vessel, both of these will generally proceed most vigorously in the center of the vessel, due to higher temperatures in the center. Therefore, more NO_{x} will be generated in the center of the vessel than near the walls. Thus, in order for selective non-catalytic reduction to be effective, sufficient amounts of the injected reactant must reach the center of the vessel, otherwise the NO_{x} in the center meets insufficient reactant for reduction and excess reactant near the walls slips through.

The choice of reactant can also influence reduction efficiency, operational costs, and safety. Urea is typically stored as 50-70% aqueous solution, which must be constantly heated and circulated in cold climates due to its high freezing point of 64 °F (18 °C). Urea can alternatively be handled and stored as solid pellets, however the additional mixing and dilution required is not economical for most sites. Ammonia (NH_{3}) is typically stored as either a 19-29% aqueous ammonia solution or as anhydrous ammonia gas, which adds an additional requirement of pressurization during transportation and storage. Importantly, urea is nontoxic and much safer to handle than ammonia. Due to these advantages, urea is more commonly used in large boiler applications in industry.

Although in theory selective non-catalytic reduction can achieve the same efficiency of about 90% as selective catalytic reduction (SCR), the practical constraints of temperature, time, and mixing often lead to worse results in practice. Across various industries, the median reductions achieved by ammonia-based SNCR systems range from 61 to 65 percent, while those achieved by urea-based SNCR systems range from 25 to 60 percent. However, selective non-catalytic reduction can still remain competitive due to its economical advantage over selective catalytic reduction, as the cost of the catalyst is eliminated.

== See also ==
Selective catalytic reduction
