= Waste Incineration Directive =

European Union Directive (EU) 2000/76

The Waste Incineration Directive, more formally Directive 2000/76/EC of the European Parliament and of the Council of 4 December 2000 on the incineration of waste (OJ L332, P91 – 111), was a Directive issued by the European Union and relates to standards and methodologies required by Europe for the practice and technology of incineration. The aim of this Directive is to minimise the impact of negative environmental effects on the environment and human health resulting from emissions to air, soil, surface and ground water from the incineration and co-incineration of waste. The requirements of the Directive were developed to reflect the ability of modern incineration plants to achieve high standards of emission control more effectively. The Directive has been replaced by the Industrial Emissions Directive since 7 January 2014.

== See also ==
- List of solid waste treatment technologies
