= Wheelabrator Baltimore =

Waste-to-energy incinerator in Baltimore, Maryland, US

Coordinates: 39°16′11.85″N 76°37′49.42″W

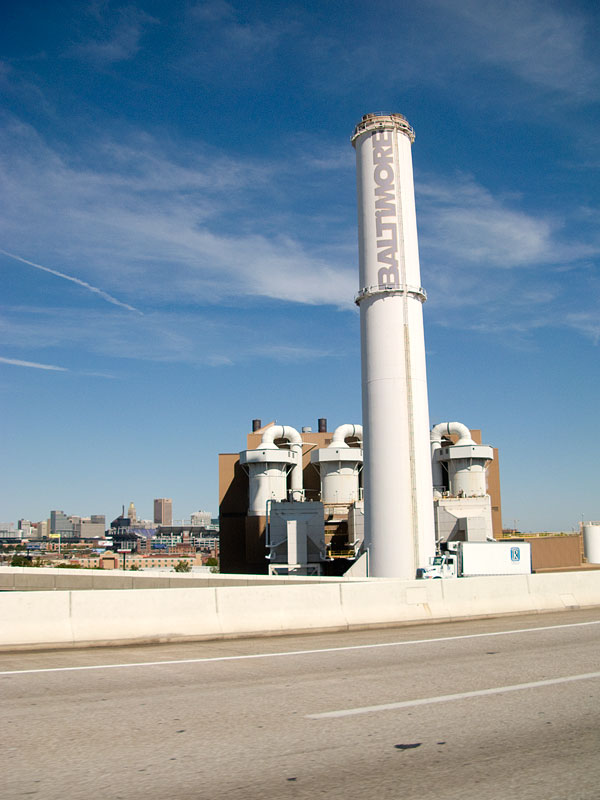
The Wheelabrator waste-to-energy facility smokestack near Interstate 95.

Wheelabrator Baltimore, also known as WIN Waste Baltimore, is a waste-to-energy incinerator located in the Westport neighborhood of Baltimore, Maryland, and is operated by Wheelabrator Technologies. It has an electric generation capacity of 64.5 megawatts. On October 2, 2018, ECP announced the agreement to sell Wheelabrator Technologies to Macquarie Infrastructure Partners, a subsidiary of Macquarie Group.

== Operation ==
In operation since 1985, the incinerator's tall white smokestack that reads "Baltimore" is considered to be a distinctive landmark for travelers on nearby Interstate 95 and the Baltimore-Washington Parkway. Formerly known as BRESCO (Baltimore Refuse Energy Systems Co.), the incinerator has been plagued by controversy over air pollution and operating with an expired air pollution permit. The ash produced at the incinerator is then used for the city's Quarantine Road landfill at Hawkins Point.

In 2010, several environmental groups, including the Washington, D.C.–based Environmental Integrity Project (EIP), the Baltimore Harbor Waterkeeper, the Chesapeake Climate Action Network, and Clean Water Action have successfully intervened in the Wheelabrator's permit-renewal process, which prompted the U.S. Environmental Protection Agency (EPA) to order the Maryland Department of the Environment (MDE) to reinforce the plant's pollution-monitoring necessities.

According to a 2011 report by the EIP, the Wheelabrator Incinerator produces more mercury, lead, and greenhouse gases per hour of energy than each of the state's four largest coal-fired power plants. In addition, the incinerator produces nitrogen oxide emissions, which can contribute to smog and pollution in the Chesapeake Bay. EIP staff attorney Jennifer Peterson stated:

This is excellent news for cleaner air and cleaner water in Maryland. Without monitoring of emissions, we are really flying blind—neither the public nor MDE can be sure what's coming out of the Wheelabrator stacks. Emission monitoring ensures that companies are actually complying with the law. We are pleased that EPA intervened here to do the right thing and hope that MDE will fix this permit and take steps to ensure that emissions monitoring of mercury, particulate matter, and other harmful pollutants is as accurate as it can be.

In 2021, the Wheelabrator Incinerator was Baltimore's "single largest standing source of air pollution."
