= Open burning of waste =

Disposal method of waste or garbage often used by third-world countries

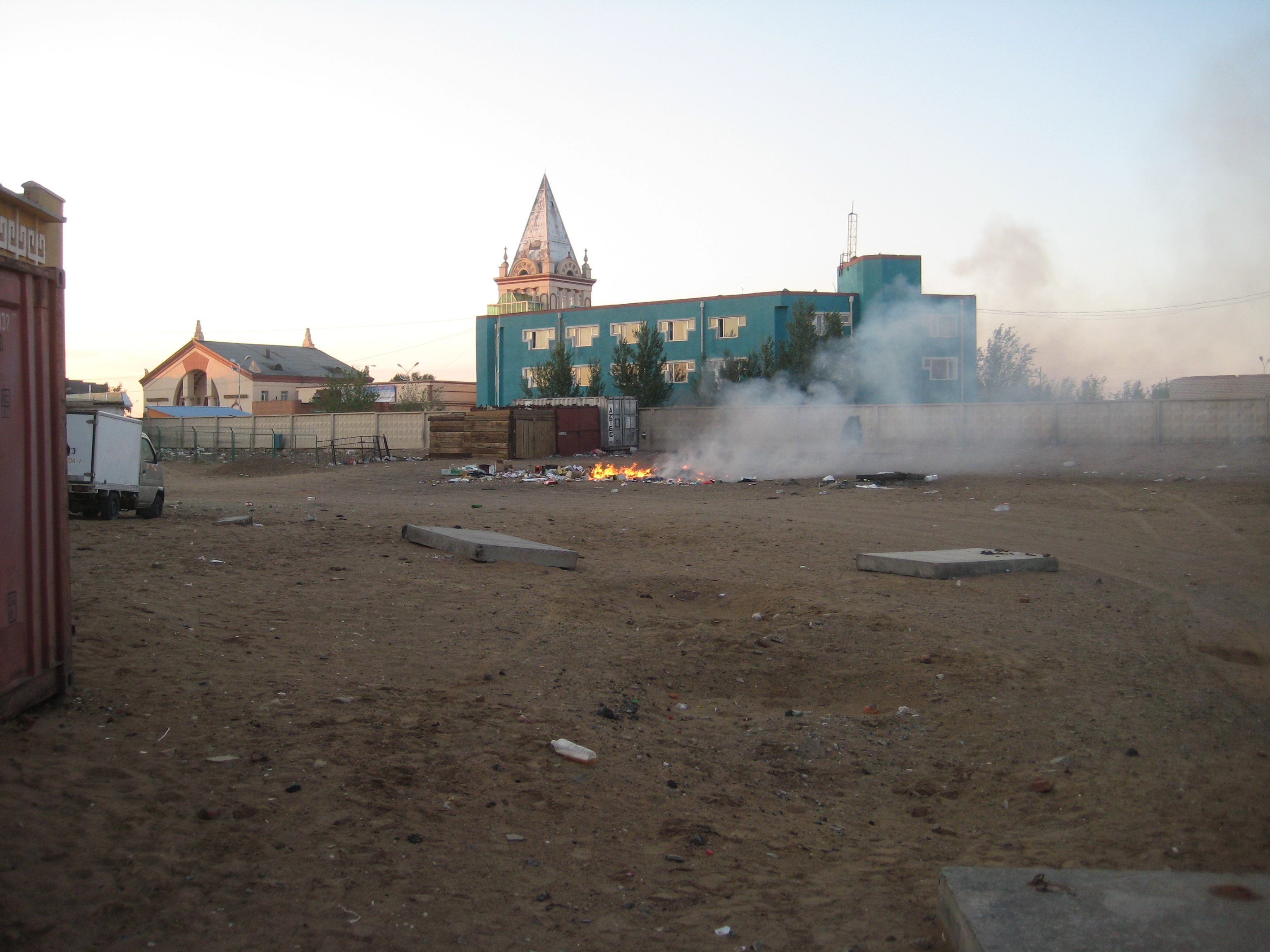
Open burning of waste in Zamyn-Üüd, Mongolia

The open burning of waste is a disposal method of waste or garbage. It is a disposal method used globally, but often used in low and middle-income countries that lack adequate waste disposal infrastructure. Numerous governments and institutions have identified the open burning of waste as a major contributor to greenhouse gas emissions. It also poses health risks with the cocktail of air pollutants often created when waste is burned in an open air environment.

At COP26 open waste burning was raised as a major contributor to climate change. It produces a wide range of atmospheric pollutants including short lived climate pollutants (SLCPs), such as black carbon (BC). BC emissions are a major source of fine particulate matter, with a climate change impact up to 5,000 greater than CO_{2}.

== Background ==
The United Nations has raised concerns about the amount of black carbon and methane produced from open burning as a method of waste disposal. Many cities and regions suffer with air pollution and low air quality as a direct result of open burning of waste.

It is common for many toxic gases to be released into the atmosphere as a result of open burning of waste. They can include POMs, PAHs, VOCs such as furans; heavy metals such as arsenic, mercury and lead; carbon monoxide, nitrogen oxides, sulphur oxides, hydrochloric acid, dioxins, and PCBs. "Some of these pollutants can also end up in the ash that is left behind from open burning of garbage". Studies by researchers from London's King’s and Imperial colleges both showed that burning of polystyrene and polyethylene terephthalate produce high amounts of soot. Both are common in plastic water bottles.

According to the Wisconsin Department of Natural Resources, “burning anything in the outdoors can cause a wildfire ... Debris burning is the number one cause of wildfires in Wisconsin and accounts for thousands of acres of forested land unintentionally burned, and hundreds of structures threatened every year”.

The climate change conference COP26 held an official side event focused on raising awareness of the open burning of waste. In September 2022, an agreement was reached on reducing open waste burning in Africa at the 18th session of the African Ministerial Conference on the Environment (AMCEN). The conference hosted delegates from 54 African countries.

== Sustainability and impact ==
The reduction of open burning can drastically change the air pollutants in the local area, therefore having a transformational impact on human health in that particular region. The Global Review on Safer End of Engineered Life suggested that the health of tens of millions of people worldwide was impacted by the disposal practice, with up to one billion tonnes burned globally each year.

At a United Nations summit in 2022, the delegation focused on job creation as one potential solution to eradicate the practice of open burning of waste, namely in Africa. Up to 80% of waste generated in African cities is recyclable, with an estimated value of $8 billion each year. Many institutions see this as an opportunity to create jobs, while improving the health and air quality on the continent.

EngineeringX produced a report into the open burning of waste in Africa in 2022, where it discussed both the challenges and opportunities. It also planned to hold a multi stakeholder partnership session at COP28 with the ambition of ending the open burning of waste in Africa by 2040.
