= WIN Waste Innovations =

American waste management company

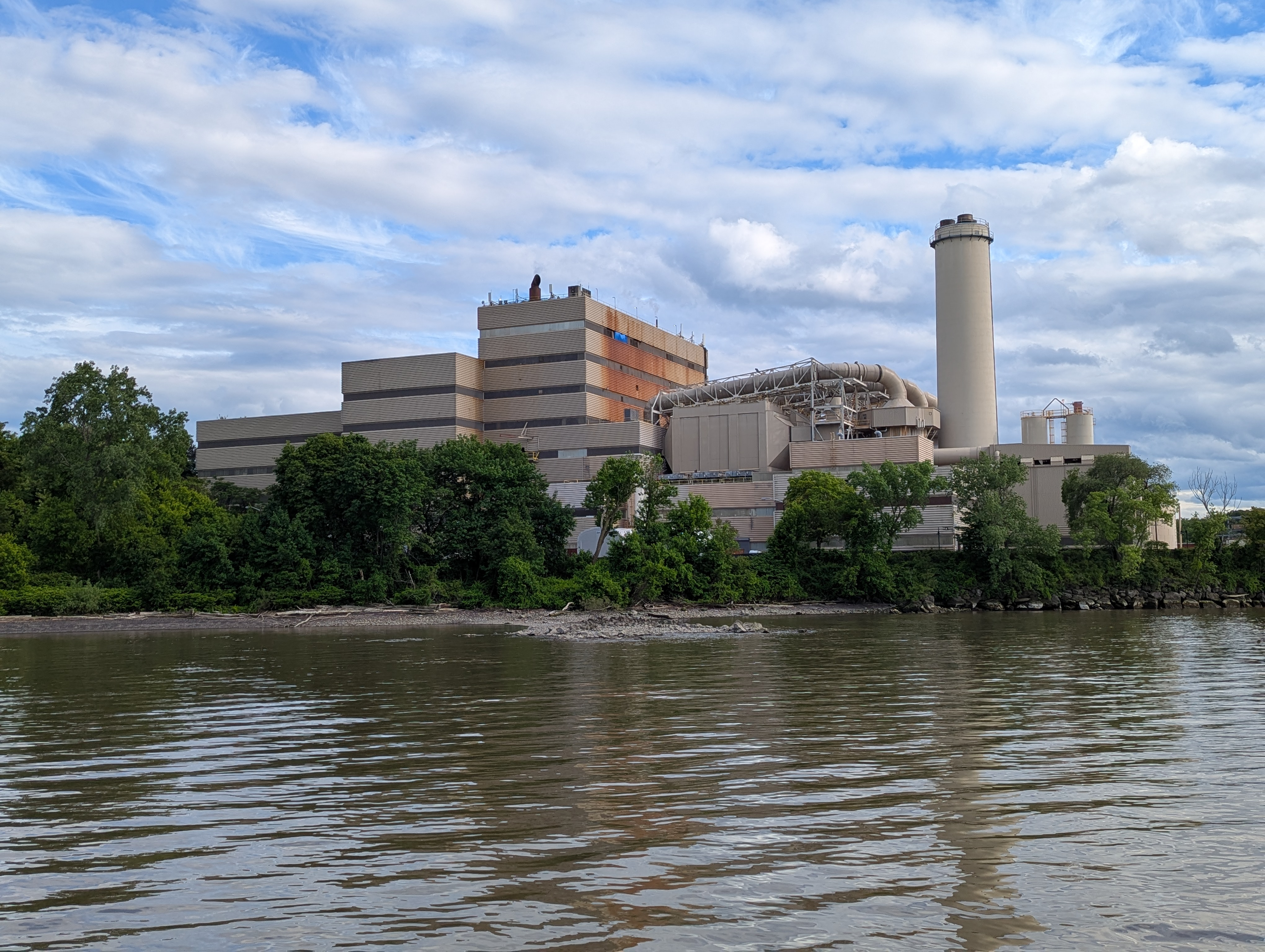
WIN waste management plant in Peekskill, New York

WIN Waste Innovations is an American waste management and incinerator company based in Portsmouth, New Hampshire, commonly known as Wheelabrator. The company began as a foundry supplier making sand blasting equipment in 1908, before creating an airless blast cleaning machine in 1933 known as the Wheelabrator. In 1982 the then Wheelabrator Frye company built the first commercial waste incinerator in Saugus, Massachusetts. The company went through several rebrands and divestments and in the 1980s took over operations of Waste Management, Inc.'s incinerator portfolio. In 1990 Waste Management took majority control of the company, which it retained until it was sold in 2014 to Energy Capital Partners. The company was bought by Macquarie Infrastructure Partners in 2019, and in 2021 it was merged with nine other Macquarie-owned waste firms to form WIN Waste Innovations.

== History ==
WIN traces its roots back to the Homogeneous Sand Mixer Co of Piqua, Ohio, in 1908. The company rebranded several times as it grew, first to the Sand Mixing Machine Co. in 1910, then to the American Foundry Equipment Co. in 1920. Following the success of the Wheelabrator product, the company was rebranded as the American Wheelabrator and Equipment Co. in 1945. In 1955 it became the Wheelabrator Corporation, and in 1971 it merged with four companies to form Wheelabrator-Frye. In 1985 the company was acquired by AlliedSignal but was quickly spun off into the Henley Group. In 1990 Waste Management acquired a 55% stake in the company, a controlling interest it retained until 2014 when it sold the company to Energy Capital Partners. ECP sold the company to Macquarie in 2019.

== Incinerators ==
- Wheelabrator Baltimore (MD)
- Wheelabrator Bridgeport (CT)
- Wheelabrator Dutchess County (NY)
- Wheelabrator Concord (NH)
- Wheelabrator Falls (PA)
- Wheelabrator Gloucester (NJ)
- Wheelabrator Hudson Falls (NY)
- Wheelabrator Lisbon (CT)
- Wheelabrator Millbury (MA)
- Wheelabrator North Andover (MA)
- Wheelabrator Saugus (MA)
- Wheelabrator Westchester (NY)
