= Aerated static pile composting =

Composting technique

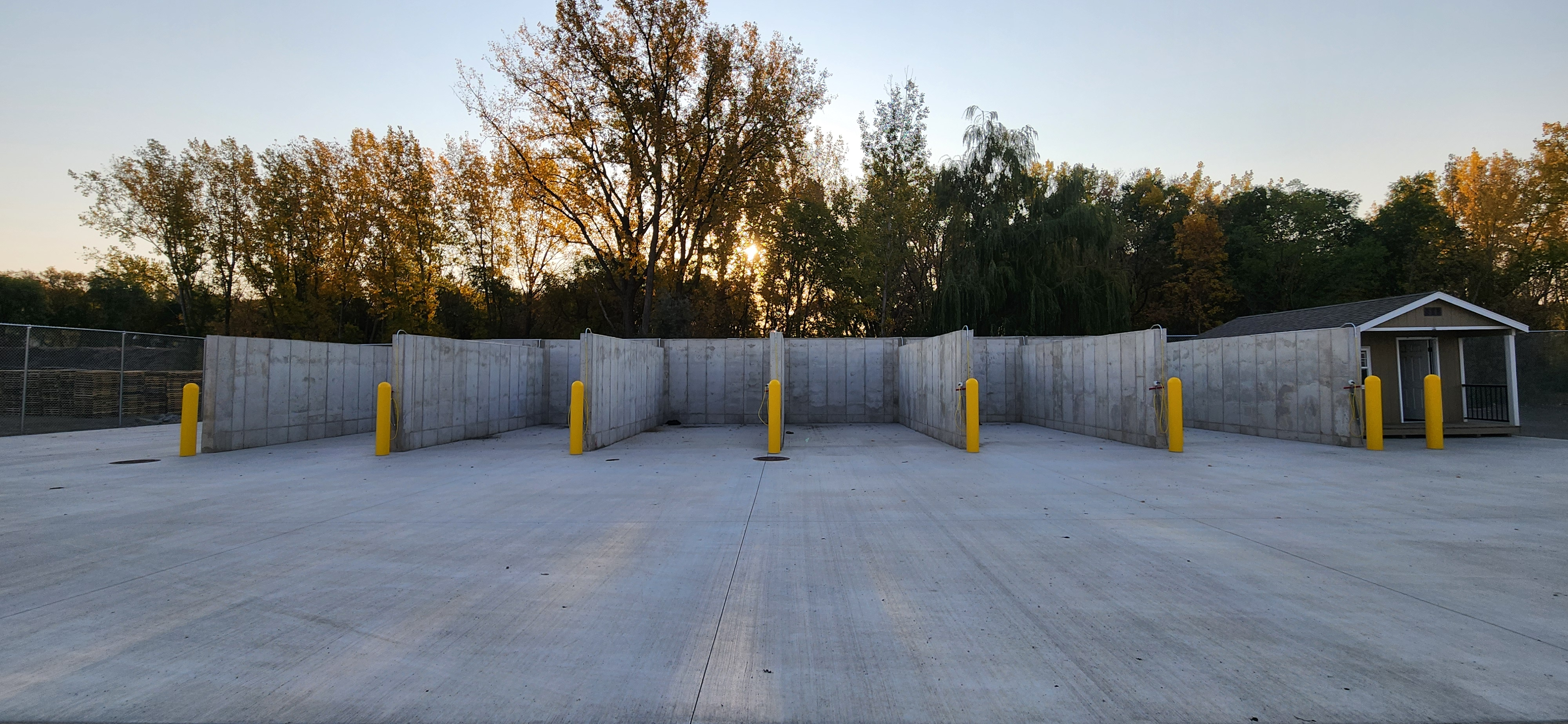
Aerated Static Pile compost facility located in the City of Hutchinson

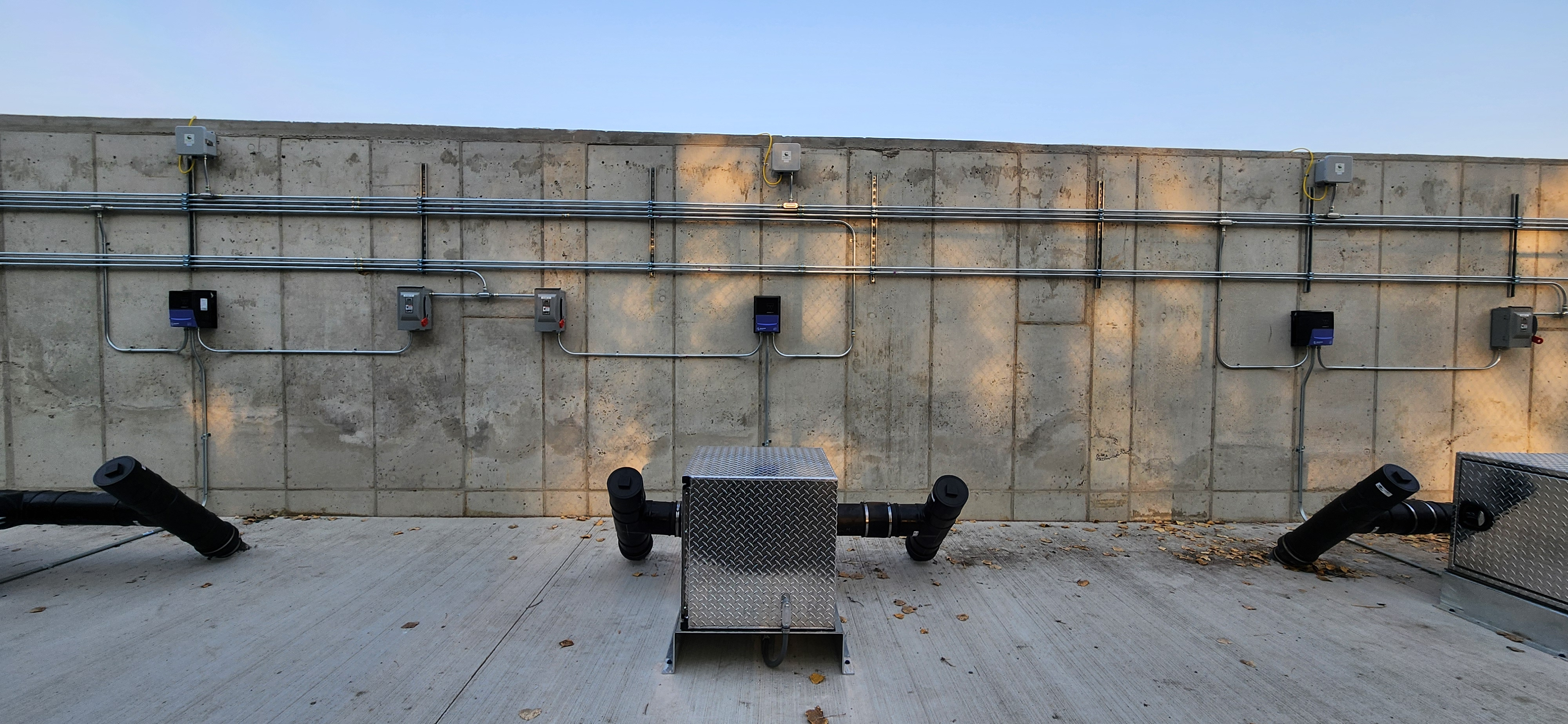
Image showing the blowers located behind the push wall in the above image

Aerated static pile (ASP) composting refers to systems using forced aeration to keep compost material aerobic without physical manipulation. This is typically done by placing mixed feedstocks on perforated piping where air is then either pumped up (positive aeration), sucked down (negative aeration), or pumped and sucked (reversing aeration) through the material. If air is sucked through the material (negative and reversing aeration) it is typically then run through a scrubber like a biofilter to remove odor and emissions.

ASPs are typically constructed outdoors in mass beds or bunker configurations (see image for example of bunker style ASP). They can also be constructed within open-sided buildings, enclosed bunkers known as tunnels, or windrows. Many ASPs are protected from rain and precipitation with a roof, reducing leachate generation and allowing operators to evaporate detained water through biodrying.

When properly designed and operated, aerated composting facilities have 95% less odor/emissions and 25% of the footprint of a comparable windrow facility. For these reasons, ASPs are typically implemented at sites composting putrescible feedstocks (manures, biosolids or food waste) with a higher potential for adverse environmental impact. They are also used at sites that are land constrained or managing wet dense feedstocks.

== Aeration ==
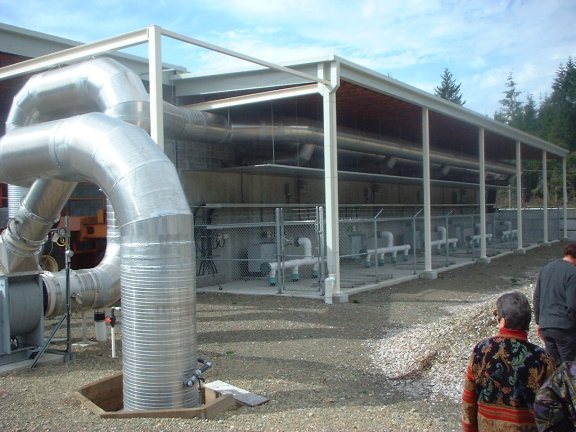
Aeration system for a closed chamber composting facility

The aeration system uses fans to push and/or pull air through the composting mass. Rigid or flexible perforated piping, connected to fans, delivers the air. The pipes can be installed in channels, on top of a floor, or included throughout the pile during buildup.

In large-scale systems, forced aeration is accompanied with a computerized monitoring system responsible for controlling the rate and schedule of air delivery to the composting mass, although meters and manual monitoring techniques may also be used in smaller scale operations.

Advantages of this composting method include the ability to maintain the proper moisture and oxygen levels for the microbial populations to operate at peak efficiency to reduce pathogens, while preventing excess heat, which can crash the system. Aerated systems also facilitate the use of biofilters to treat process air to remove particulates and mitigate odors prior to venting. However, aerated systems can dry out quickly and must be monitored closely to maintain desired moisture levels.

== Types of Aerated Static Pile Systems ==
Aerated static pile (ASP) composting systems can be constructed in a number of different configurations depending on how air is supplied to the pile and how odors, moisture, and stormwater are managed. The most common types include below-grade aerated static pile systems, pipe-on-grade systems, turned aerated pile systems, and covered aerated static pile systems.

=== Below-Grade Aerated Static Pile (ASP) ===
Below-grade aerated static pile (ASP) systems use aeration infrastructure installed below the composting pad. Air is supplied through underground piping, spargers, trenches, or precast concrete aeration channels. Compost is placed directly above the aeration system and is usually covered with 6 to 12 inches (15 to 30 cm) of finished compost, wood chips, or compost overs. The cover layer functions as a biofilter and can reduce odors and other emissions released from the pile by as much as 98%.

Because the aeration system is installed below the surface, there is little equipment to remove or reposition between composting cycles. Below-grade systems generally have a higher construction cost than surface pipe systems, but operating costs are often lower because less labor is required during normal operation.

=== Pipe-on-Grade Aerated Static Pile (ASP) ===
Pipe-on-grade aerated static pile (ASP) systems sometimes referred to as extended aerated static piles (eASP) use perforated aeration pipes placed directly on top of the composting pad before the pile is constructed. After composting is complete, the pipes are either disposed of or removed and reused for the next batch.

Pipe-on-grade systems require relatively little permanent infrastructure and can be installed on existing compost pads, or raw soil. They generally have lower capital costs than below-grade systems, however they have the highest operational costs due to the cost of replacing pipes.

=== Turned Aerated Pile (TAP) ===
Turned aerated pile (TAP), sometimes called aerated windrow systems, combine forced aeration with periodic turning of the compost pile. Air is supplied through an aeration system while the material is mechanically turned to improve porosity, redistribute moisture, and remix the feedstock. This typically leads to the fastest composting process, and results in higher quality finished compost.

Compared with conventional turned windrows, forced aeration reduces the number of turns and odor emissions during active composting. These systems generally require less permanent infrastructure than fully static systems but continue to rely on regular use of turning equipment throughout the composting process.

=== Tunnel Composting ===
Tunnel composting refers to a below-grade aerated static pile system, in which each zone or bay is individually enclosed within a concrete or hoop house structure. Material is typically loaded into the tunnel using a front-end loader, after which the tunnel is sealed for the active composting period. Air is supplied through an aeration floor or duct system and is commonly controlled using temperature, oxygen, or carbon dioxide measurements.

Because the composting process takes place within an enclosed structure, process air can be collected and treated using biofilters, acid scrubbers, or other air pollution control equipment before being discharged. This generally provides the highest level control of odor, volatile organic compounds (VOCs), and ammonia emissions of any composting technology. Enclosed tunnels also prevent rainfall from contacting the compost, reducing process water generation and simplifying stormwater management.

Tunnel systems generally have the highest capital cost of the common composting technologies due to the enclosed structures, aeration floor, process controls, and air treatment equipment. However, they offer odor and emissions control up to 98%, require relatively little land area and have lower operating costs as covers do not need to be replaced. They are commonly used where odor control, environmental permitting, or space constraints are major design considerations.

=== Covered Aerated Static Pile (cASP) ===
Covered aerated static pile (cASP) systems use a semi-permeable membrane placed over the compost pile during active composting. The membrane allows some water vapor and gases to pass while reducing odor emissions and limiting rainfall from entering the pile. Odor and emission reductions of 70% to 80% have been reported for some membrane systems.

By limiting rainfall infiltration, covered systems can simplify stormwater management and help maintain moisture in the compost pile, which can be useful in both very wet and very dry climates. However, because the membrane also reduces moisture loss, these systems are generally not well suited for biodrying applications.

The membrane also creates additional resistance to airflow, which limits aeration rates compared with uncovered ASP systems. This can increase composting time for high-energy feedstocks such as food waste, mortality waste, depackaged organics, and the organic fraction of municipal solid waste (OFMSW). Covered ASP systems generally have higher capital and operating costs than uncovered systems because of the membrane infrastructure and the need to replace the membrane periodically, typically every 5 to 8 years.

== See also ==
- List of composting systems
- Anaerobic digestion
- In-vessel composting
- List of solid waste treatment technologies
- Windrow composting
