= In-vessel composting =

Composting processed in large vessels

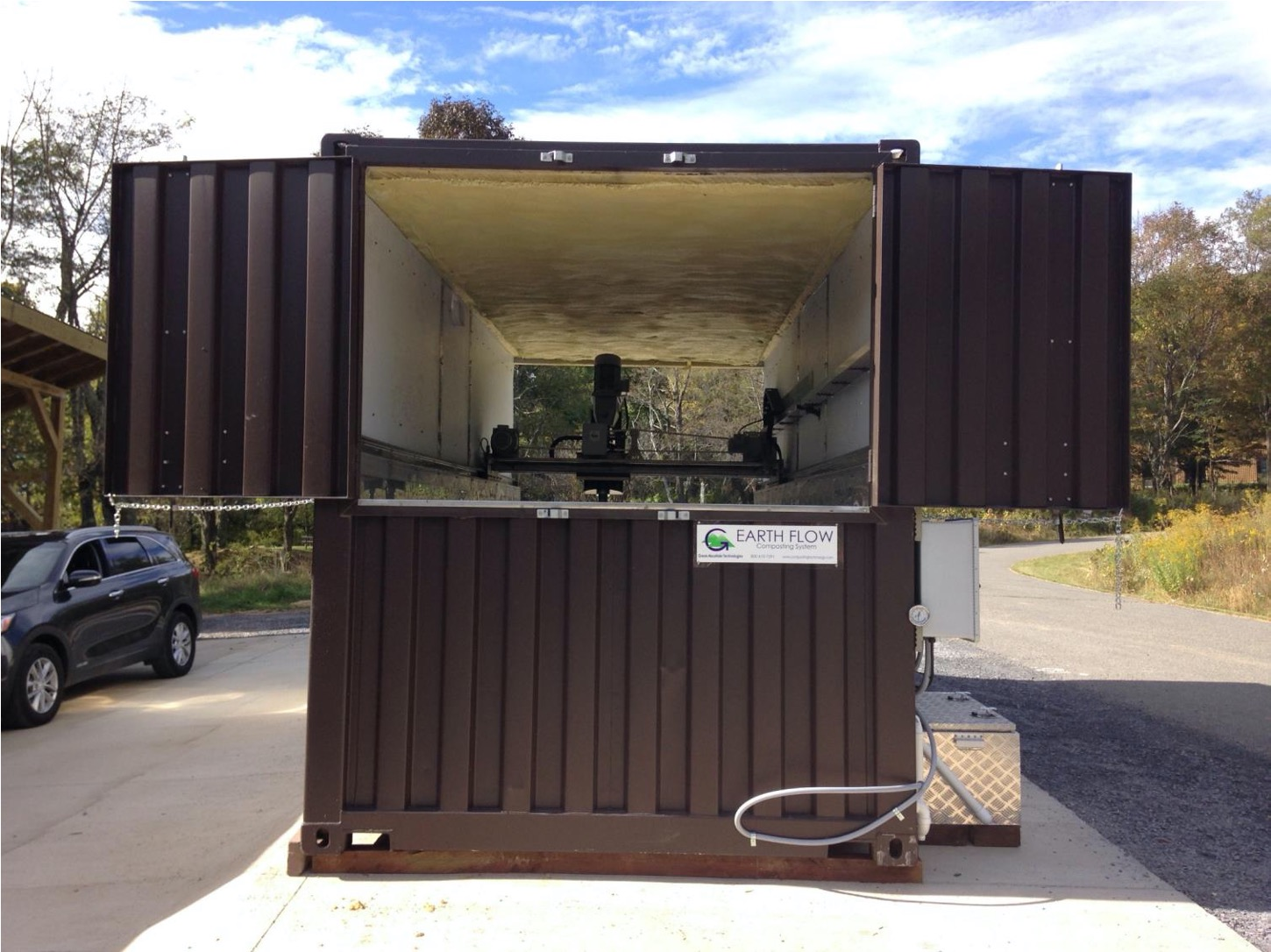
In-vessel composter using a blower and auger to aerate and mix the material

In-vessel composting generally describes a group of methods that confine the composting materials within a building, container, or vessel. In-vessel composting systems can consist of metal or plastic tanks or concrete bunkers in which air flow and temperature can be controlled, using the principles of a "bioreactor". Generally the air circulation is metered in via buried tubes that allow fresh air to be injected under pressure, with the exhaust being extracted through a biofilter, with temperature and moisture conditions monitored using probes in the mass to allow maintenance of optimum aerobic decomposition conditions. Many in-vessel composters also use augers or rotation to agitate the material, speeding up degradation by continuously homogenizing and mechanically aerating the material. Common examples of this include rotary drum composters from manufacturers like XACT and auger based in-vessel technology like the Earth Flow from Green Mountain Technologies and Biomax G by Sorain Cecchinni.

In-vessel composting is generally used for putrescible municipal scale organic waste processing, including final treatment of sewage biosolids, food waste, or the organic fraction of municipal solid waste. In-vessel composting allows for sanitization of pathogens so the waste can be reclaimed as a soil amendment, while minimizing the environmental impact in the form of odors, runoff or emissions. In-vessel composting can also refer to aerated static pile composting within a building or under removable covers that enclose the piles, as with the system in extensive use by farmer groups in Thailand, supported by the National Science and Technology Development Agency there. In recent years, smaller scale in-vessel composting has been advanced. These often use custom or common roll-off waste dumpsters as the vessel. They may also use retrofitted shipping containers or custom drums.

Using roll-off dumpsters or shipping containers present some advantages as they are low cost, widely available, they are highly mobile, often do not need building permits and can be obtained by renting or buying. Recent innovations with roll-off dumpsters, used as in-vessel composters, include the integration of biofiltration for gaseous emissions and the capture of leachate at the door preventing release of liquid emissions.

In recent studies, in-vessel composting with frequent auger based agitation has proven to be the most efficient composting approach for the degradation of compostable plastics with nearly 100% degradation of both compostable fiber and plastic when compared with traditional windrow and ASP composting. This is likely due to the high temperatures combined with frequent agitation, ensuring all materials break down evenly.

Evaluation is ongoing with regard to the health risks associated with compost derived from sewage biosolids—including identifying safe levels of contaminants such as PFAS.

Offensive odors are caused by putrefaction (anaerobic decomposition) of nitrogenous animal and vegetable matter gassing off as ammonia and other volatile organic carbon's (VOC's). This is controlled with a higher carbon to nitrogen ratio, increased aeration, increased exhausting to a biofilter, more frequent turning and use of a coarser grade of carbon material to allow better air circulation. Prevention and capture of any gases naturally occurring (volatile organic compounds) during the hot aerobic composting involved is the objective of the biofilter, and as the filtering material saturates over time, it can be used in the composting process and replaced with fresh material.

In-vessel composting may also be coupled with anaerobic digestion, to produce both energy and compost. For this to be done effectively it is important that some waste bypasses the digestors going directly to composting and digestion time is reduced have enough energy in the material for composting. Some anaerobic digestors can sterilize digestate prior to composting if they are able to reach temperatures between 41 and 122 °C (106 and 252 °F).§

== Gallery ==
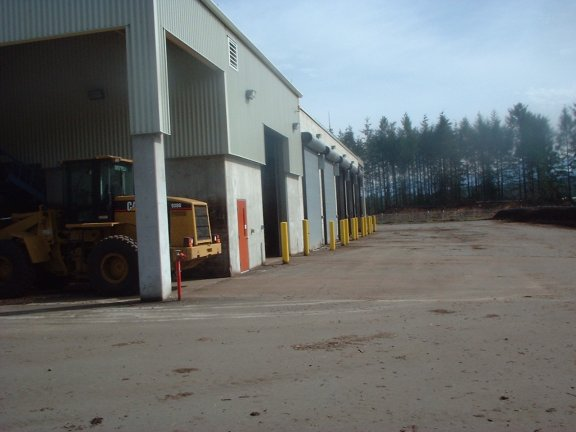
Biosolids composting facility – receiving and mixing bays and five reactor chambers

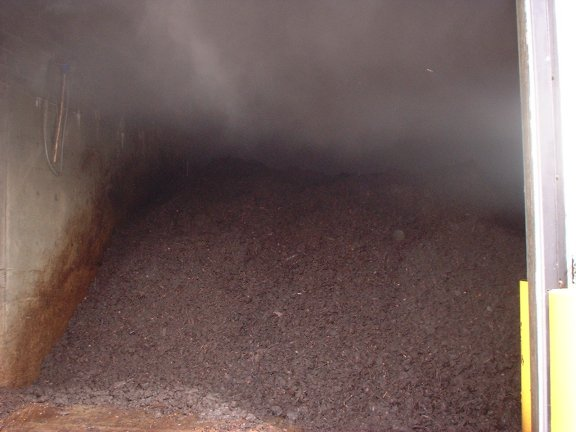
Composting chamber material after one week

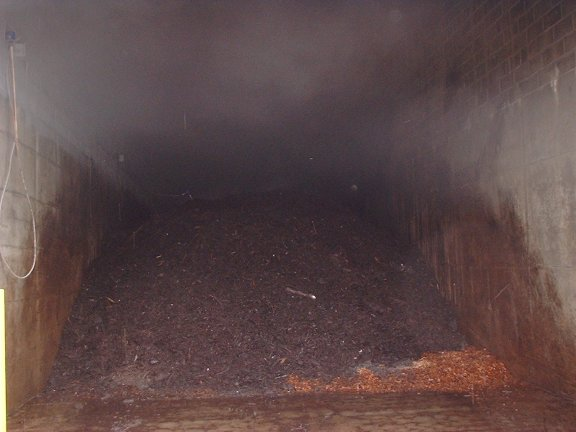
Composting chamber material after two weeks

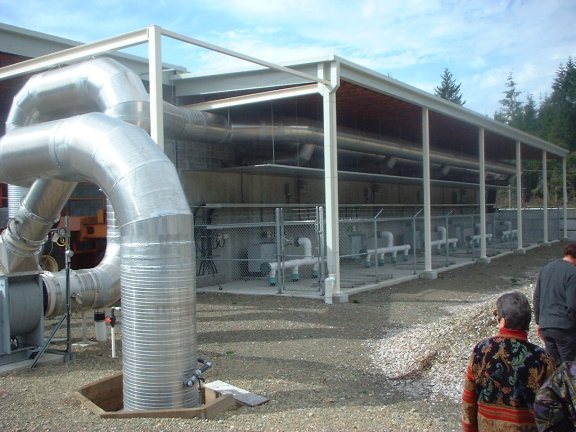
Air supply and exhaust system for enclosed composting

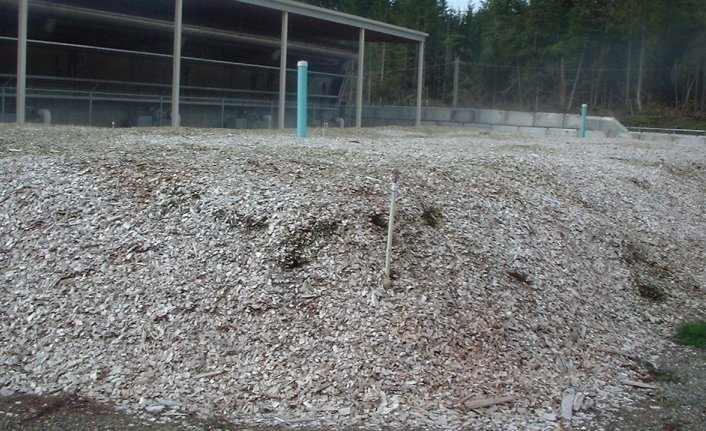
Exhaust biofilter mound

== See also ==
- Aerated static pile composting
- Anaerobic digestion
- Compost
- List of solid waste treatment technologies
- Mechanical biological treatment
- Waste management
- Windrow composting
