= Windrow composting =

Compost production method

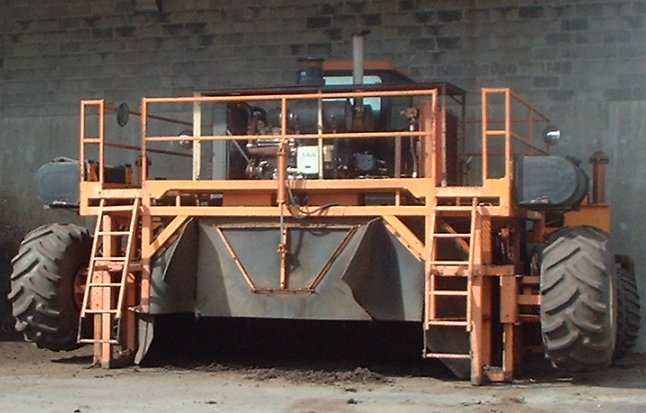
Windrow turner used on maturing piles at a biosolids composting facility in Canada

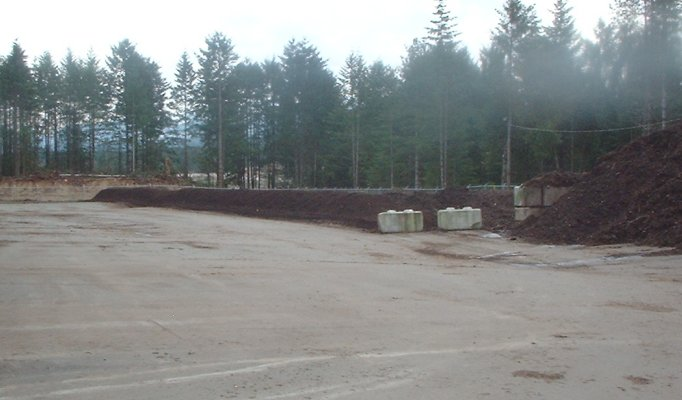
Maturing windrows at an in-vessel composting facility

In agriculture, windrow composting is the production of compost by piling organic matter or biodegradable waste, such as animal manure and crop residues, in long rows – windrow.

As the process is aerobic, it is also known as open windrow composting (OWC) or open air windrow composting (OAWC).

This method is suited to producing large volumes of compost. These rows are generally turned to improve porosity and oxygen content, mix in or remove moisture, and redistribute cooler and hotter portions of the pile. Windrow composting is a commonly used farm scale composting method. Composting process control parameters include the initial ratios of carbon and nitrogen rich materials, the amount of bulking agent added to assure air porosity, the pile size, moisture content, and turning frequency. The temperature of the windrows must be measured and logged constantly to determine the optimum time to turn them for quicker compost production.

== Compost windrow turners ==
Compost windrow turners were first developed to produce compost on a large scale by Fletcher Sims Jr. of Canyon, Texas. They are traditionally a large machine that straddles a windrow of 4 feet (1.2 meters) or more high, by as much as 12 feet (3.7 meters) across. Although smaller machines exist for small windrows, most operations use large machines for volume production. Turners drive through the windrow at a slow rate of forward movement. They have a steel drum with paddles that are rapidly turning. As the turner moves through the windrow, fresh air (oxygen) is injected into the compost by the drum/paddle assembly, and waste gases produced by bacterial decomposition are vented. The oxygen feeds the aerobic bacteria and thus speeds the composting process.

Utilization

To properly use a compost windrow turner, it is ideal to compost on a hard surfaced pad. Heavy-duty compost windrow turners allow the user to obtain optimum results with the aerobic hot composting process. By using four wheel drive or tracks the windrow turner is capable of turning compost in windrows located in remote locations. With a self-trailering option this allows the compost windrow turner to convert itself into a trailer to be pulled by a semi-truck tractor. These two options combined allow the compost windrow turner to be easily hauled anywhere and to work compost windrows in muddy and wet locations.

== Specific applications ==
Molasses-based distilleries all over the world generate large amount of effluent termed as spent wash or vinasse. For each liter of alcohol produced, around 8 liters of effluent is generated. This effluent has chemical oxygen demand (COD) of 1,50,000 PPM and biochemical oxygen demand (BOD) of 60,000 PPM and even more. This effluent needs to be treated and the only effective method for conclusive disposal is by composting.

Sugar factories generate pressmud / cachaza during the process and the same has about 30% fibers as carbon and has large amounts of water. This pressmud is dumped on prepared land in the form of 100 meters long windrows of 3 meters x 1.5 meters and spent wash is sprayed on the windrow while the windrow is being turned. These machines help consume spent wash of about 2.5 times of the volume of the pressmud, which means that 100 meters of windrow accommodates about 166 MT of pressmud and uses about 415 m^{3} of spent wash in 50 days.

Microbial Culture (organic solution) TRIO COM-CULT is used about 1 kg per MT of pressmud for fast de-composing of the spent wash. Hundreds of thousands of square meters of spent wash is being composted all over the world in countries like India, Colombia, Brazil, Thailand, Indonesia, South Africa etc.

The compost yard has to be prepared in such a way that the land is impervious and does not allow the liquid effluent to pass down into the earth. The compost thus generated is of excellent quality and is rich in nutrients.

== See also ==
- Aerated static pile composting
- In-vessel composting
