= Windrow =

Row of cut hay

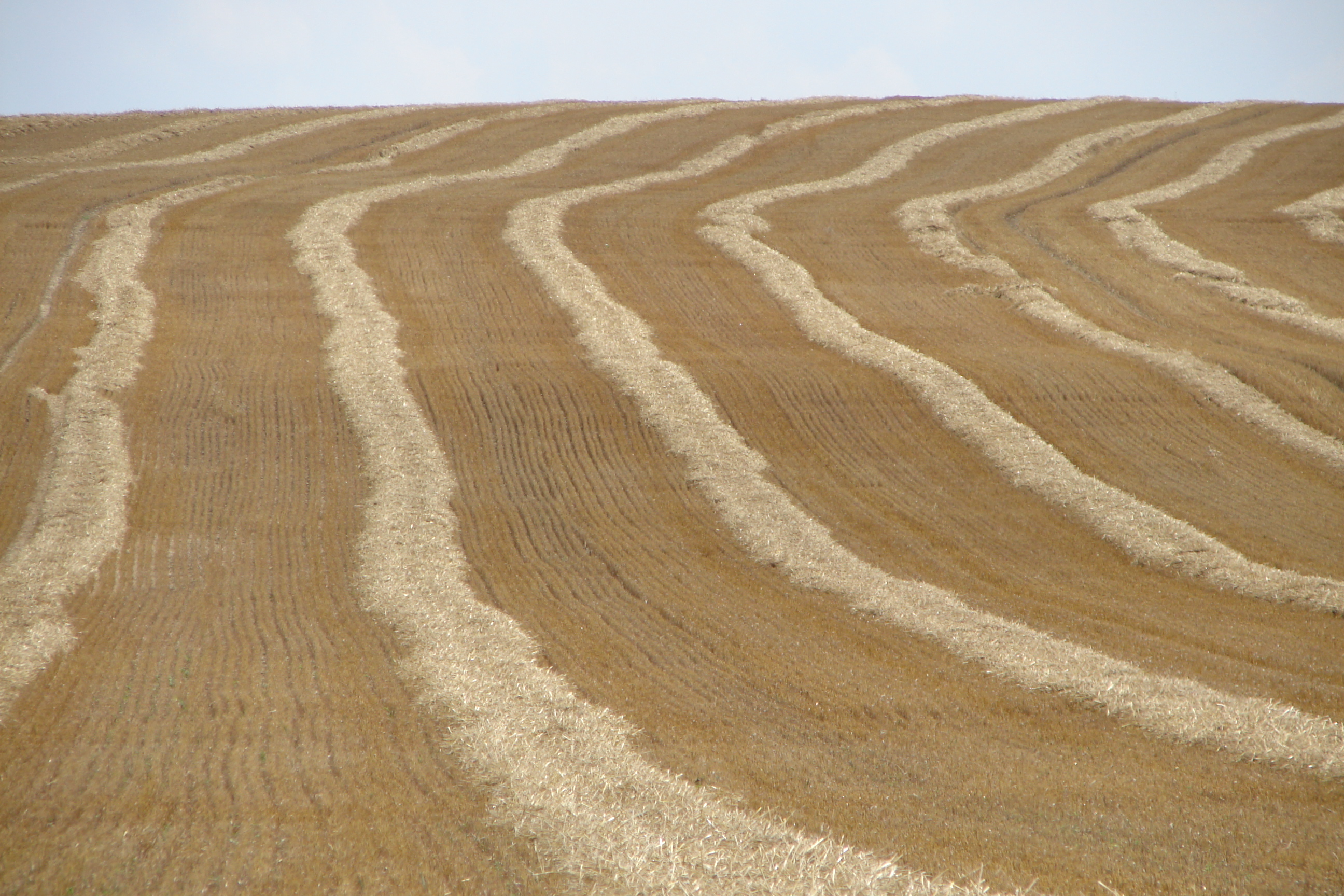
Windrows of straw, along with stubble.

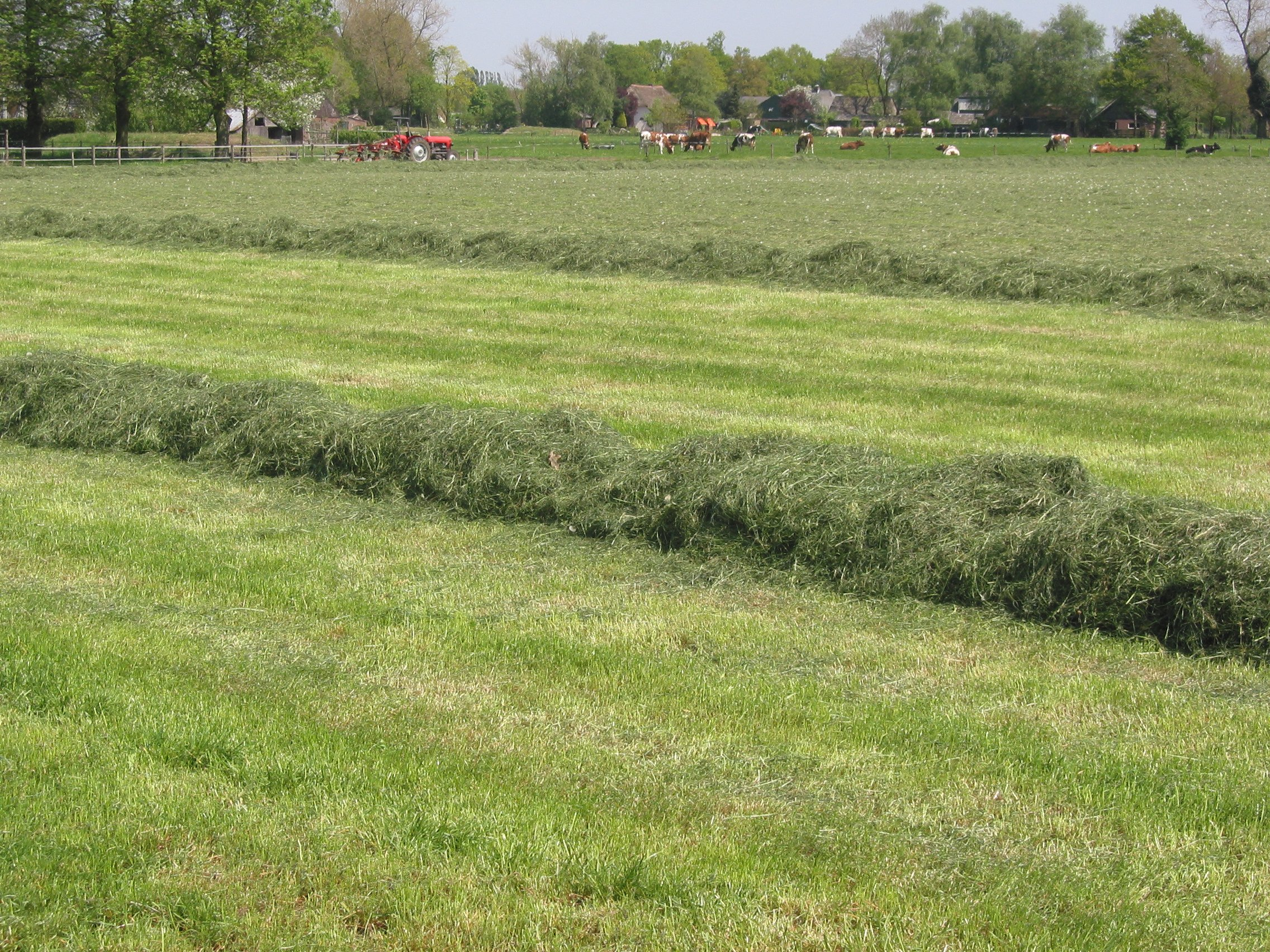
Grass for silage in a windrow awaiting collection.

A windrow is a row of cut (mown) hay or small grain crop. It is allowed to dry before being baled, combined, or rolled. For hay, the windrow is often formed by a hay rake, which rakes hay that has been cut by a mowing machine or by scythe into a row, or it may naturally form as the hay is mown. For small grain crops which are to be harvested, the windrow is formed by a swather which both cuts the crop and forms the windrow.

By analogy, the term may also be applied to a row of any other material such as snow, earth or materials for collection.

- Snow windrows are created by snow plows when clearing roads of snow; where this blocks driveways the windrow may require removal. Snow windrowed to the centre of the street can be removed by a snow blower and truck. In preparing a pond or lake for ice cutting, the snow on top of the ice, which slows freezing, might be scraped off and windrowed.
- Earth windrows may be formed by graders when grading earthworks or dirt roads
- Leaf windrows may be required for municipal collection.
- Fossil windrows are a grouping of fossils that have been deposited together as a result of turbulence or wave action in a marine or freshwater environment. Fossils of similar shape and size are commonly found grouped or sorted together as a result of separation based on weight and shape.
- Seaweed windrows form on sea or lake surfaces because of cylindrical Langmuir circulation just under the surface caused by wind action.

Windrow composting is a large scale vermicomposting system where garden and other biodegradable waste is shredded, mixed and windrowed for composting.

== See also ==
- Windrow composting
- Windrow Formation
- The dictionary definition of windrow at Wiktionary
