= Waste autoclave =

Form of solid waste treatment

A waste autoclave is an industrial autoclave that uses heat, steam and pressure as a form of solid waste treatment to pre-process potentially biologically active waste and render it safe prior to disposal. This can be part of a large-scale centralized process (as is the case with municipal solid waste) or on a smaller scale as part of the regular operating procedures at individual facilities or labs, including hospitals and clinics, universities, testing labs, the quality assurance and quality control departments of food and beverage makers, regional airports that must handle regulated garbage, and veterinary offices and clinics.

Large-scale waste autoclaves process waste either in batches or in continuous-flow processes. In batch processes, saturated steam is pumped into the autoclave at temperatures around 160 °C, or 320 °F. The steam pressure in the vessel is maintained up to 6 bars (gauge) for a period of up to 45 minutes to allow the process to fully "cook" the waste. The autoclave process gives a very high pathogen and virus kill rate, although the fibrous products which come from the process are susceptible to bacteria and fungus as they are high in starch, cellulose and amino acids. When designed for sterilizing waste containing mostly liquids, a waste autoclave is known as an effluent decontamination system.

Small-scale individual waste autoclaves are more similar to standard lab/medical autoclaves, in size and operation. They process waste loads in batches, using steam pressurized to 1 bar to raise the load to a temperature of around 121 °C (250 °F) for 45 to 90 minutes (or more).

Although not technically an type of autoclaves, waste converters fulfill a similar role in some small-scale applications. A waste converter can operate in the atmospheric pressure range to achieve full sterilization of pathogenic waste. Super heating conditions and steam generation are achieved by variable pressure control, which cycles between ambient and negative pressure within the sterilization vessel. The advantage of this approach is the elimination of complexities associated with operating pressure vessels. However, steam that is not 97% saturated may not contain sufficient energy to kill the spores that may be on the surface of the items it comes in contact with.

== Waste Autoclaving Process ==
In both large-scale and small-scale "batch system" autoclave processes, the "cooking" process causes plastics to soften and flatten, paper and other fibrous material to disintegrate into a fibrous mass, bottles and metal objects to be cleaned, and labels etc., to be removed. The process can reduce the bulk volume of the waste by ~60%. After "cooking", the steam flow is stopped, and the pressure vented via a condenser. When depressurized, the autoclave door is opened and the autoclave chamber emptied. In small-scale autoclaves this can be done by hand. For convenience, waste is normally bagged prior to processing, and placed in large heat-proof trays. With large-scale municipal solid waste (MSW) autoclaves, the unloading process is automated with a rotating the drum that discharges the sterilized material to be separated by a series of screens and recovery systems.

A large-scale continuous-flow autoclave processes for MSW is somewhat different. In this process glass, stones, and metals are removed from the waste stream before the "cooking" begins, thus saving considerable energy, labor and equipment costs. With this process, waste enters, and the product leaves the autoclave without the loss of temperature or pressure in the vessel. The material moves continuously through the process via computer-controlled process conveyors. After the waste is loaded onto the initial conveyor, the entire process is automated, and it does not require human intervention to clean the inside of the vessel.

In early systems, the primary product was cellulose fibers. This comprises the putrescible (decomposable), cellulose and lignin elements of the waste stream. The fibers can be fed into anaerobic digesters to reduce the biodegradability of the waste and to produce biogas. Alternatively, the fiber could be used as biofuel. Some systems claim to wash out hydrolyzed hemicellulose sugars and most of the protein as water-soluble. The remaining materials, after simple physical separation (trommel screen) has several valuable uses. One system claims to be able to dry the cellulose during processing using heat, and another system is able to dry it (much more economically) using pressure and steam kinetics. After fiber separation, the secondary streams consist of mixed plastics (which have normally been softened and deformed which eases separation) a glass and aggregate stream, separate ferrous and non-ferrous metals. The heat, steam and rotating action of the autoclave vessel strip off labels and glues from food cans leaving a very high quality ferrous/non-ferrous stream for recycling. With the removal of water, fiber, metals, and much of the plastics, the residual waste stream for disposal may be less than 10% by weight of the original stream and is essentially devoid of materials that decompose to produce methane. Systems in Europe meet and exceed all of the European waste treatment and recycling requirements.

The full process of loading, treatment and sorting is typically completed within 90 minutes. In a typical batch-type configuration, two 10-ton units operating side by side would treat 275–300 tons per day with time for preventative maintenance. Continuous flow systems are modular and are specifically designed to match the necessary capacity.

The size of the vessel varies between vendors. Experience shows that "small" vessels are not productive enough; while if the vessel is too large, the heavy weight of the vessel may cause equipment failures.
