= Waste =

Unwanted or unusable materials

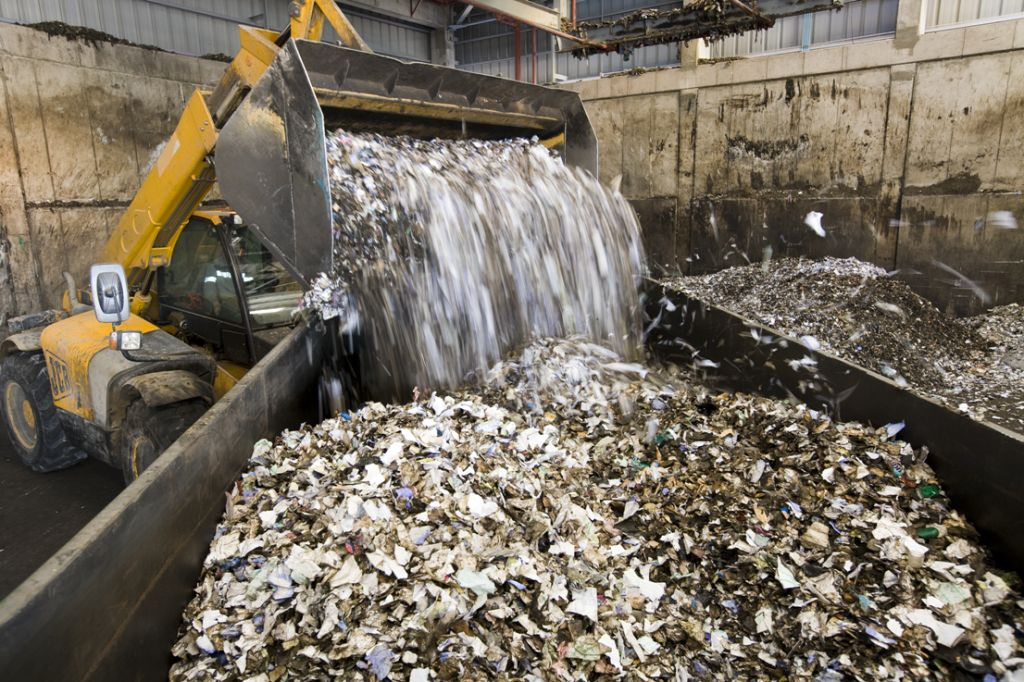
Solid waste after being shredded to a uniform size

Waste are unwanted or unusable materials. Waste is any substance discarded after primary use, or is worthless, defective and of no use. A by-product, by contrast is a joint product of relatively minor economic value. A waste product may become a by-product, joint product or resource through an invention that raises a waste product's value above zero.

Examples include municipal solid waste (household garbage), hazardous waste, wastewater (such as sewage, which contains bodily wastes (feces and urine) and surface runoff), radioactive waste, and others.

== Definitions ==
People may have differing views on what constitutes waste as what is considered waste, could be viewed as a resource by someone else. The Cambridge Dictionary definition includes "unwanted matter or material of any type". The definitions used by the United Nations, European Union and some governments are detailed below.

=== United Nations Environment Program ===
According to the Basel Convention on the Control of Transboundary Movements of Hazardous Wastes and Their Disposal of 1989, Art. 2(1), "'Wastes' are substance or objects, which are disposed of or are intended to be disposed of or are required to be disposed of by the provisions of national law".

=== United Nations Statistics Division ===
The UNSD Glossary of Environment Statistics describes waste as "materials that are not prime products (that is, products produced for the market) for which the generator has no further use in terms of his/her own purposes of production, transformation or consumption, and of which he/she wants to dispose. Wastes may be generated during the extraction of raw materials, the processing of raw materials into intermediate and final products, the consumption of final products, and other human activities. Residuals recycled or reused at the place of generation are excluded."

=== European Union ===
Under the Waste Framework Directive 2008/98/EC, Art. 3(1), the European Union defines waste as "an object the holder discards, intends to discard or is required to discard." For a more structural description of the Waste Directive, see the European Commission's summary.

=== Canada ===
The Canadian government defines waste as generally any material, non-hazardous or hazardous, that has no further use.

=== United Kingdom ===
In the UK, the government defines waste as materials that become waste when the producer or owner discards it, intends to discard it, or is required to discard it.

=== Australia ===
Defined as materials or products that are unwanted or have been discarded, rejected or abandoned.

== Types of waste ==
=== Wastewater ===
Wastewater is water generated after the use of drinking water, fresh water, raw water, or saline water in a variety of deliberate applications or processes. Another definition of wastewater is "Used water from any combination of domestic, industrial, commercial or agricultural activities, surface runoff / storm water, and any sewer infiltration or sewer inflow". In everyday usage, wastewater is commonly a synonym for sewage (also called domestic wastewater or municipal wastewater), which is wastewater that is produced by a community of people.

=== Municipal waste ===
The Organization for Economic Co-operation and Development also known as OECD defines municipal solid waste (MSW) as "waste collected and treated by or for municipalities". Typically this type of waste includes household waste, commercial waste, and demolition or construction waste. In 2018, the Environmental Protection Agency (EPA) concluded that 292.4 million U.S. short tons (2,000 lbs) of municipal waste was generated which equated to about 4.9 pounds per day per person. Out of the 292.4 million tons, approximately 69 million tons were recycled, and 25 million tons were composted.

=== Household waste and commercial waste ===
Household waste more commonly known as trash or garbage are items that are typically thrown away daily from ordinary households. Items often included in this category include product packaging, yard waste, clothing, food scraps, appliances, paints, and batteries. Most of the items that are collected by municipalities end up in landfills across the world. In the United States, it is estimated that 11.3 million tons of textile waste is generated. On an individual level, it is estimated that the average American throws away 81.5 pounds of clothes each year. As online shopping becomes more prevalent, items such as cardboard, bubble wrap, shipping envelopes are ending up in landfills across the United States. The EPA has estimated that approximately 10.1 million tons of plastic containers and packaging ended up landfills in 2018. The EPA noted that only 30.5% of plastic containers and packaging was recycled or combusted as an energy source. Additionally, approximately 940,000 pounds of cardboard ends up in the landfill each year.

Commercial waste is very similar to household waste. To be considered as commercial waste, it must come from a business or commercial occupancy. This can be restaurants, retail occupants, manufacturing occupants or similar businesses. Typically, commercial waste contains similar items such as food scraps, cardboard, paper, and shipping materials. Generally speaking, commercial waste creates more waste than household waste on a per location basis.

=== Construction and demolition waste ===
The EPA defines this type of waste as "Construction and Demolition (C&D) debris is a type of waste that is not included in municipal solid waste (MSW)." Items typically found in C&D include but are not limited to steel, wood products, drywall and plaster, brick and clay tile, asphalt shingles, concrete, and asphalt. Generally speaking, construction and demolition waste can be categorized as any components needed to build infrastructures. In 2018, the EPA estimated that the US generated approximately 600 million tons of C&D waste. The waste generated by construction and demolition is often intended to be reused or is sent to the landfill. Examples of reused waste is milled asphalt can be used again for the asphalt mixture or fill dirt can be used to level grade.

=== Hazardous waste ===
The EPA defines hazardous waste as "a waste with properties that make it dangerous or capable of having a harmful effect on human health or the environment." Hazardous Waste falls under the Resource Conservation and Recovery Act (RCRA). Under the RCRA, the EPA has the authority to control hazardous waste during its entire lifecycle. This means from the point of creation to the point where it has been properly disposed of. The life cycle of hazardous waste includes generation, transportation, treatment, and storage and disposal. All of which are included in the RCRA. Some forms of hazardous waste include radioactive waste, explosive waste, and electronic waste.

=== Radioactive waste ===
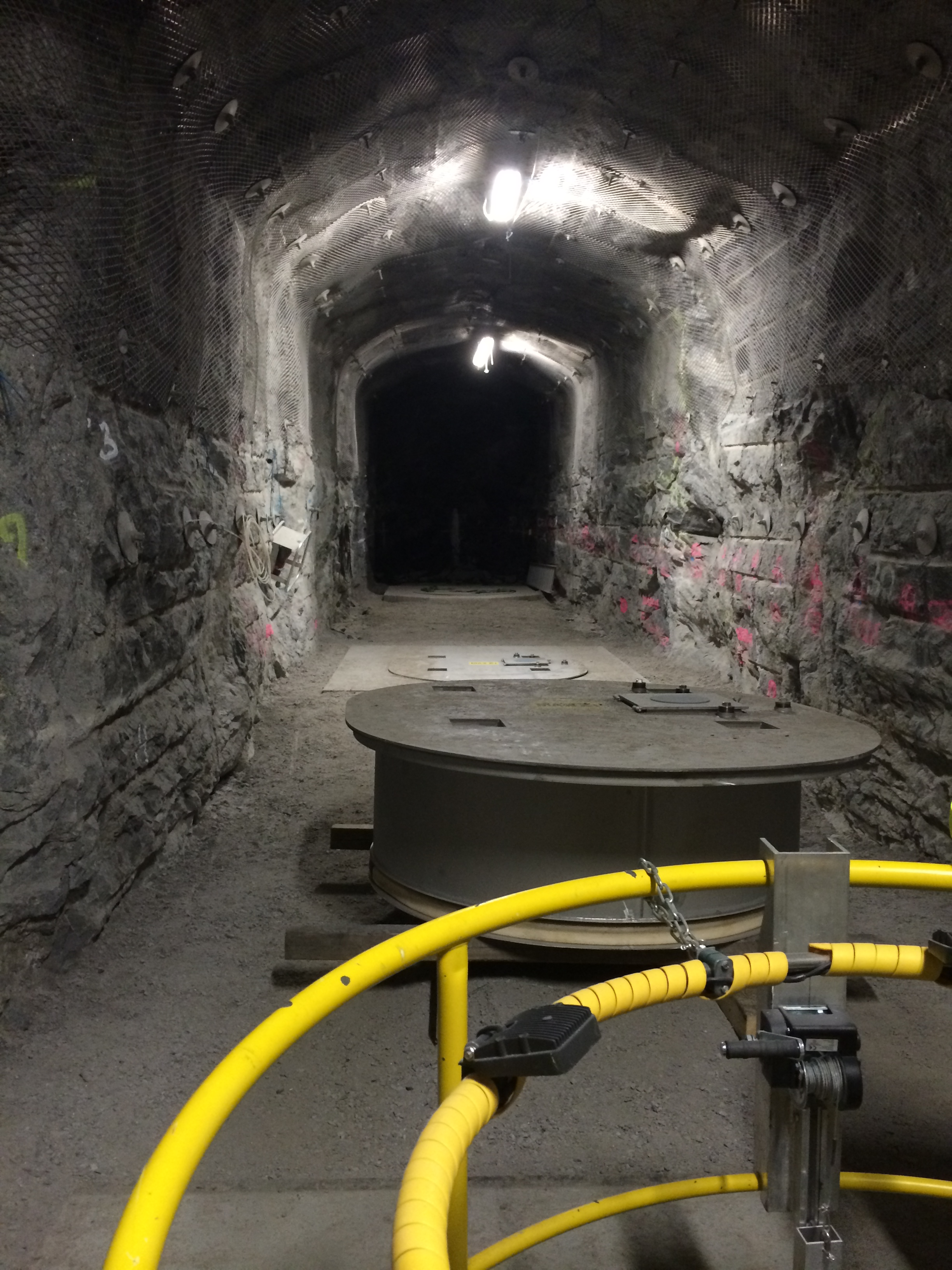
Onkalo, a deep geological repository for the final disposal of the radioactive waste, located near the Olkiluoto Nuclear Power Plant in Eurajoki, Finland

Radioactive waste, often referred to as nuclear waste, is produced by various industries such as nuclear power plants, nuclear reactors, hospitals, research centers, and mining facilities. Any activity that involves radioactive material can generate radioactive waste. Furthermore, such waste emits radioactive particles, which if not handled correctly, can be both an environmental hazard as well as a human health hazard. When dealing with radioactive waste, it is extremely important to understand the necessary protocols and follow the correct precautions. Failure to handle and recycle these materials can have catastrophic consequences and potentially damage the site's ecosystems for years to come.

Radioactive waste is monitored and regulated by multiple governmental agencies such as Nuclear Regulatory Commission (NRC), Department of Energy (DOE), Environmental Protection Agency (EPA), Department of Transportation (DOT), and Department of the Interior (DOI). Each agency plays an important role in creating, handling, and properly disposing of radioactive waste. A brief description of each agency's role can be found below.

NRC: "Licenses and regulates the receipt and possession of high-level waste at privately owned facilities and at certain DOE facilities."

DOE: "Plans and carries out programs for sand handling of DOE-generated radioactive wastes, develops waste disposal technologies, and will design, construct and operate disposal facilities for DOE-generated and commercial high-level wastes."

EPA: "Develops environmental standards and federal radiation protection guidance for offsite radiation due to the disposal of spent nuclear fuel and high-level and transuranic radioactive wastes."

DOT: "Regulates both the packaging and carriage of all hazardous materials including radioactive waste."

DOI: "Through the U.S. Geological Survey, conducts laboratory and field geologic investigations in support of DOE's waste disposal programs and collaborates with DOE on earth science technical activities."

The US currently defines five types of radioactive waste, as shown below.

High-level Waste: This type of radioactive waste is generated from nuclear reactors or reprocessing spent nuclear fuel.

Transuranic Waste: This type of radioactive waste is man-made and has an atomic number of 92 or higher.

Uranium or thorium mill tailings: This type of radioactive waste is a result after the mining or milling or uranium or thorium ore.

Low-level waste: This type of radioactive waste is radioactively contaminated waste. It is typically generated from industrial processes or research. Examples of these items include paper, protective clothing, bags, and cardboard.

Technologically enhanced naturally occurring radioactive material (TENORM): This type of radioactive waste is created through human activity such as mining, oil and gas drilling, and water treatment where naturally occurring radiological material (NORM) becomes concentrated.

=== Energetic hazardous waste ===
The EPA defines energetic hazardous waste as "wastes that have the potential to detonate and bulk military propellants which cannot safely be disposed of through other modes of treatments." The items which typically fall under this category include munitions, fireworks, flares, hobby rockets, and automobile propellants.

==== Munitions ====
Munitions were added to hazardous waste in 1997 when the EPA finalized RCRA. A special rule was added to address munitions in waste. This new rule is commonly referred to as the Military Munitions Rule. The EPA defines military munitions as "all types of both conventional and chemical ammunition products and their components, produced by or for the military for national defense and security (including munitions produced by other parties under contract to or acting as an agent for DOD—in the case of Government Owned/Contractor Operated [GOCO] operations)." While a large percentage of munitions waste is generated by the government or governmental contractors, residents also throw away expired or faulty ammunition inside their household waste.

==== Fireworks, flares, and hobby rockets ====
Every year, the US generates this type of waste from both the commercial and consumer aspects. This waste is often generated from fireworks, signal flares and hobby rockets which have been damaged, failed to operate or for other reasons. Due to their chemical properties, these types of devices are extremely dangerous.

==== Automobile airbag propellants ====
While automobile airbag propellants are not as common as munitions and fireworks, they share similar properties which makes them extremely hazardous. Airbag propellants characteristics of reactivity and ignitability are the characteristics which qualify for hazardous waste. When disposed undeployed, leaves these two hazardous characteristics intact. To properly dispose of these items, they must be safely deployed which removes these hazardous characteristics.

The EPA includes the waste of automobile airbag propellants under the RCRA. In 2018, the EPA issued a final rule on handling of automobile airbag propellants. The "interim final rule"provides an exemption of entities which install and remove airbags. This includes automobile dealerships, salvage yards, automobile repair facilities and collision centers. The handler and transporter are exempt from RCRA, but the airbag waste collection facility is not exempt. Once the airbags have met the collection center, it will then be classified as RCRA hazardous waste and must be disposed or recycled at a RCRA disposal facility.

=== Electronic waste ===
Electronic waste, often referred to as "E-Waste" or "E-Scrap," are often thrown away or sent to a recycler. E-Waste continues to end up in landfills across the world. The EPA estimates that in 2009, 2.37 million tons of televisions, computers, cell phones, printers, scanners, and fax machines were discarded by US consumers. Only 25% of these devices were recycled; the remainder ended up in landfills across the US.

E-Waste contains many elements that can be recycled or re-used. Typically speaking, electronics are encased in a plastic or light metal enclosure. Items such as computer boards, wiring, capacitors, and small motor items are common types of E-waste. Of these items, the internal components include iron, gold, palladium, platinum, and copper, all of which are mined from the earth. It requires energy to operate the equipment to mine these metals, which emits greenhouse gases into the atmosphere. Donating e-waste to recycling centers or refurbishing this equipment can reduce the greenhouse gases emitted through the mining process as well as decrease the use of natural resources to ensure future generations will have sufficient access to these resources.

As this issue continued to grow, President Obama established the Interagency Task Force on Electronics Stewardship in November 2010. The overall goal for this task was to develop a national strategy for handling and proper disposal of electronic waste. The task force would work with the White House Council on Environmental Quality (CEQ), EPA, and the US General Services Administration (GSA). The task force released its final product, the National Strategy for Electronics Stewardship report. The report focuses on four goals of the federal government's plan to enhance the management of electronics:

1. Incentivizing greener design of electronics

2. Leading by example

3. Increasing domestic recycling

4. Reducing harmful exports of e-waste and building capacity in developing countries.

E-Waste is not only a problem in the US, but also a global issue. Tackling this issue requires collaboration from multiple agencies across the world. Some agencies involved in this include U.S. EPA, Taiwan Environmental Protection Administration (Taiwan EPA), International E-Waste Management Network (IEMN), and environmental offices from Asia, Latin America, the Caribbean, Africa, and North America.

=== Mixed waste ===
Mixed waste is a term that has different definitions based on its context. Most commonly, mixed waste refers to hazardous waste which contains radioactive material. In this context, the management of mixed waste is regulated by the EPA and RCRA and Atomic Energy Act. The hazardous materials content is regulated by RCRA while the radiological component is regulated by the Department of Energy (DOE) and Nuclear Regulatory Commission (NRC).

Mixed waste can also be defined as a type of waste which includes recyclable materials and organic materials. Some examples of mixed waste in this context include a combination of broken glassware, floor sweepings, non-repairable household goods, non-recyclable plastic and metal, clothing, and furnishings. Additionally, ashes, soot, and residential renovation waste materials are also included under this definition.

=== Medical Waste ===
This type of waste is typically generated from hospitals, physicians' offices, dental practices, blood banks, veterinary offices, and research facilities. This waste has often been contaminated with bodily fluids from humans or animals. Examples of this type of contamination can include blood, vomit, urine, and other bodily fluids. Concerns started to generate when medical waste was appearing on east coast beaches in the 1980s. This forced congress to pass the Medical Waste Tracking Act. This act was only in effect for approximately 3 years after the EPA concluded the "disease-causing medical waste was greatest at the point of generation and naturally tapers off after that point."

Prior to the Hospital Medical Infectious Waste Incinerator (HMIWI) standard, approximately 90% of the infectious waste was incinerated before 1997. Due to the potential of negatively affect air quality, alternative treatment and disposal technologies for medical waste was developed. These new alternatives include:

- Thermal Treatment, such as microwave technologies
- Steam sterilization, such as autoclaving
- Electropyrolysis
- Chemical mechanical systems

== Reporting ==
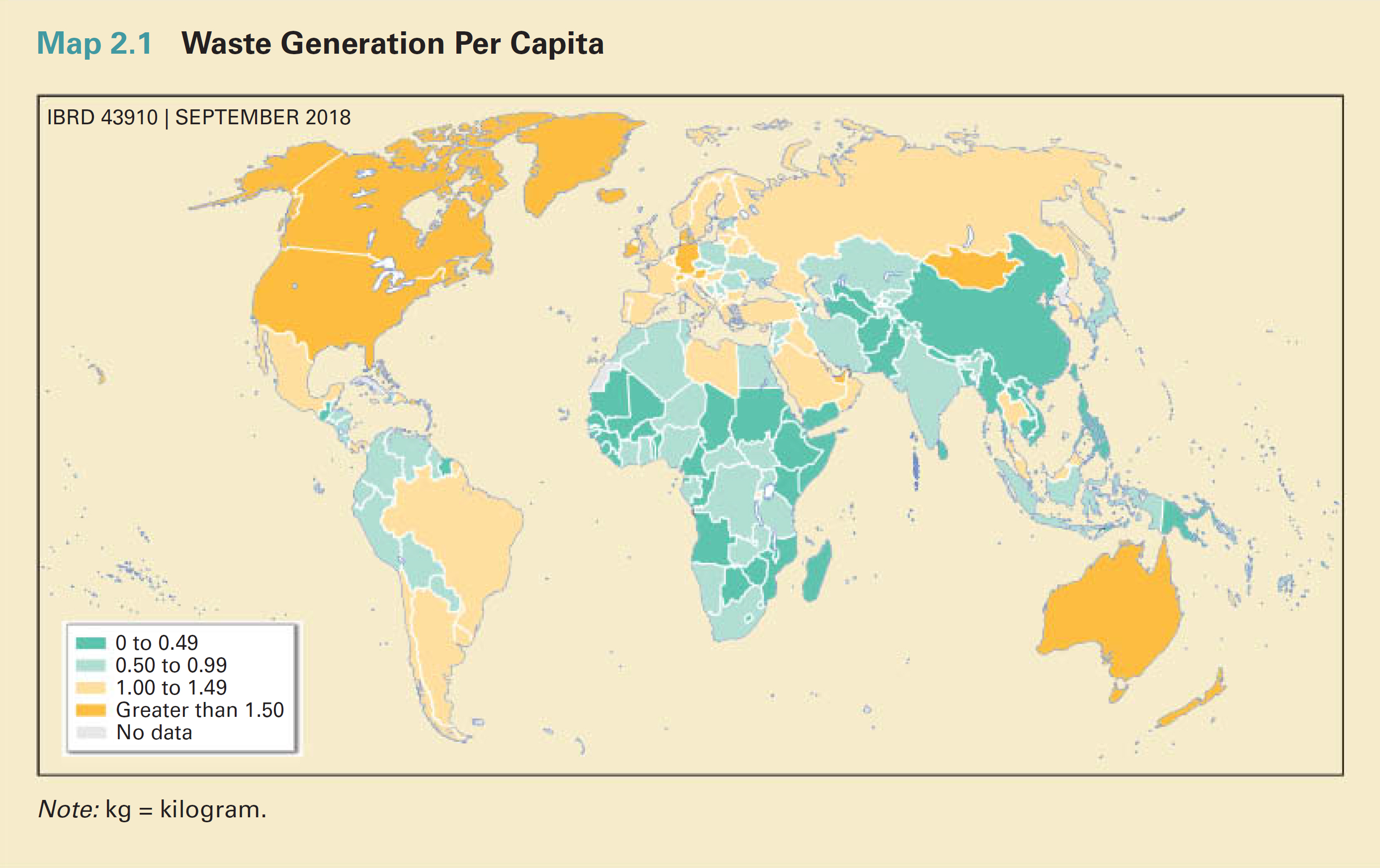
Waste generation, measured in kilograms per person per day

There are many issues that surround reporting waste. It is most commonly measured by size or weight, and there is a stark difference between the two. For example, organic waste is much heavier when it is wet, and plastic or glass bottles can have different weights but be the same size. On a global scale it is difficult to report waste because countries have different definitions of waste and what falls into waste categories, as well as different ways of reporting. Based on incomplete reports from its parties, the Basel Convention estimated 338 million tonnes of waste was generated in 2001. For the same year, OECD estimated 4 billion tonnes from its member countries. Despite these inconsistencies, waste reporting is still useful on a small and large scale to determine key causes and locations, and to find ways of preventing, minimizing, recovering, treating, and disposing of waste.

== Costs ==
=== Environmental costs ===
Inappropriately managed waste can attract rodents and insects, which can harbor gastrointestinal parasites, yellow fever, worms, various diseases, and other conditions for humans, and exposure to hazardous wastes, particularly when they are burned, can cause various other diseases including cancers.Toxic waste materials can contaminate surface water, groundwater, soil, and air, which causes more problems for humans, other species, and ecosystems. A form of waste disposal involving combustion creates a significant amount of greenhouse gases. When the burned waste contains metals, it can create toxic gases. On the other hand, when the waste contains plastics, the gases produce contain CO_{2}_{.} As global warming and CO_{2} emissions increase, soil begins to become a larger carbon sink and will become increasingly valuable for plant life.

=== Social costs ===
Waste management is a significant environmental justice issue. Many of the environmental burdens cited above are more often borne by marginalized groups, such as racial minorities, women, and residents of developing nations. NIMBY (not in my back yard) is the opposition of residents to a proposal for a new development because it is close to them. However, the need for expansion and siting of waste treatment and disposal facilities is increasing worldwide. There is now a growing market in the transboundary movement of waste, and although most waste that flows between countries goes between developed nations, a significant amount of waste is moved from developed to developing nations.

=== Economic costs ===
The economic costs of managing waste are high, and are often paid for by municipal governments; money can often be saved with more efficiently designed collection routes, modifying vehicles, and with public education. Environmental policies such as pay as you throw can reduce the cost of management and reduce waste quantities. Waste recovery (that is, recycling, reuse) can curb economic costs because it avoids extracting raw materials and often cuts transportation costs. "Economic assessment of municipal waste management systems – case studies using a combination of life-cycle assessment (LCA) and life-cycle costing (LCC)". The location of waste treatment and disposal facilities often reduces property values due to noise, dust, pollution, unsightliness, and negative stigma. The informal waste sector consists mostly of waste pickers who scavenge for metals, glass, plastic, textiles, and other materials and then trade them for a profit. This sector can significantly alter or reduce waste in a particular system, but other negative economic effects come with the disease, poverty, exploitation, and abuse of its workers.

=== Affecting communities ===
People in developing countries suffer from contaminated water and landfills caused by unlawful government policies that allow first-world countries and companies to transport their trash to their homes and oftentimes near bodies of water. Those same governments do not use any waste trade profits to create ways to manage landfills or clean water sources. Photographer Kevin McElvaney documents the world's biggest e-waste dump called Agbogbloshie in Accra, Ghana, which used to be a wetland. The young men and children that work in Agbogbloshie smash devices to get to the metals, obtain burns, eye damage, lung and back problems, chronic nausea, debilitating headaches, and respiratory problems and most workers die from cancer in their 20s (McElvaney). In McElvaney's photos, kids in fields burning refrigerators and computers with blackened hands and trashed clothes and animals, such as cows with open wounds, in the dumpsite. There are piles of waste used as makeshift bridges over lakes, with metals and chemicals just seeping into the water and groundwater that could be linked to homes' water systems. The same unfortunate situation and dumps/landfills can be seen in similar countries that are considered the third world, such as other West African countries and China. Many are advocating for waste management, a stop to the waste trade, the creation of wastewater treatment facilities, and providing a clean and accessible water source. The health of all these people in landfills and water are human necessities/rights that are being taken away.

== Management ==
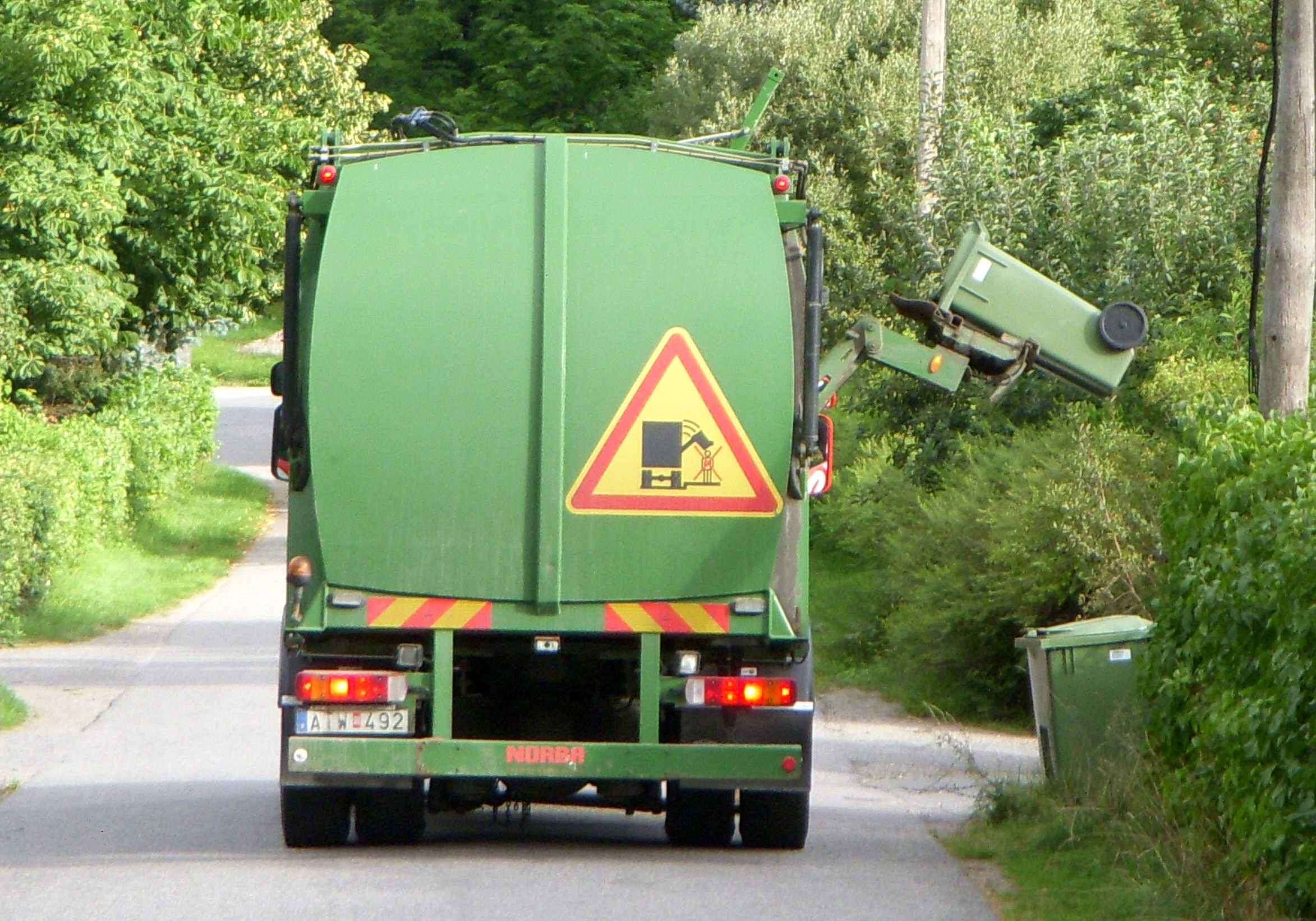
A specialized trash collection truck providing regular municipal trash collection in a neighborhood in Stockholm, Sweden.

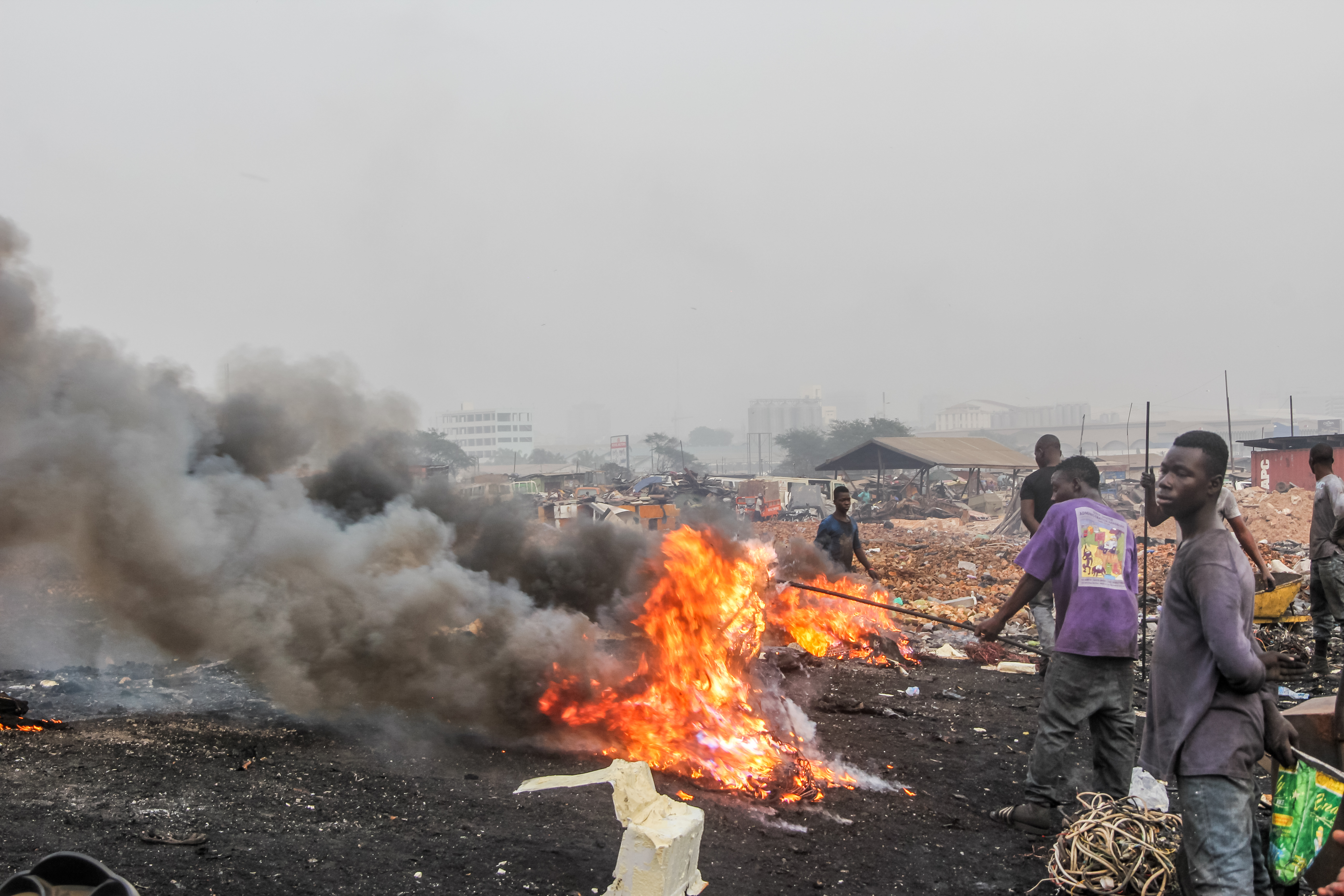
Waste pickers burning e-waste in Agbogbloshie, a site near Accra in Ghana that processes large volumes of international electronic waste. The pickers burn the plastics off of materials and collect the metals for recycling, However, this process exposes pickers and their local communities to toxic fumes.

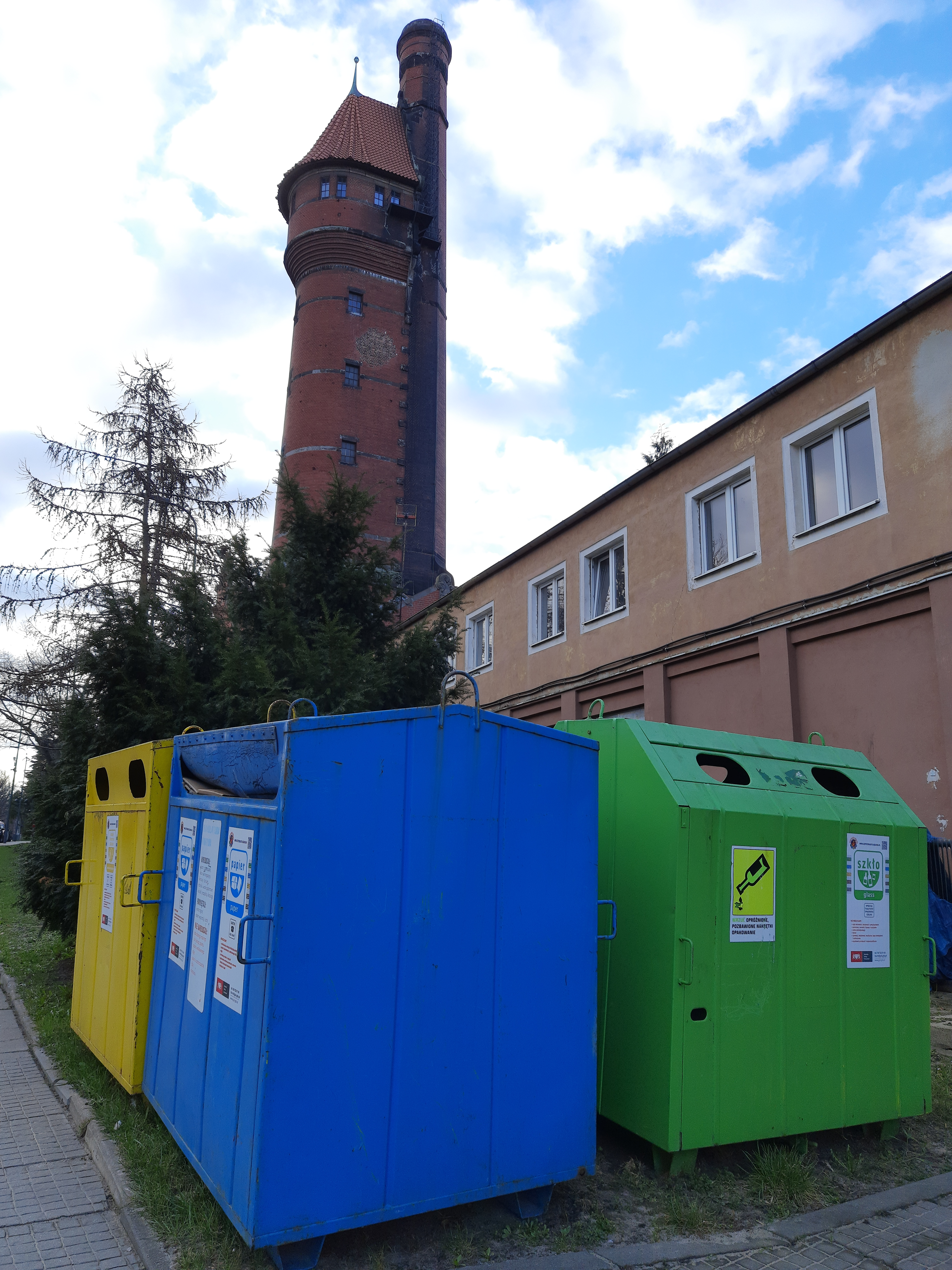
Containers for consumer waste collection at the Gdańsk University of Technology.

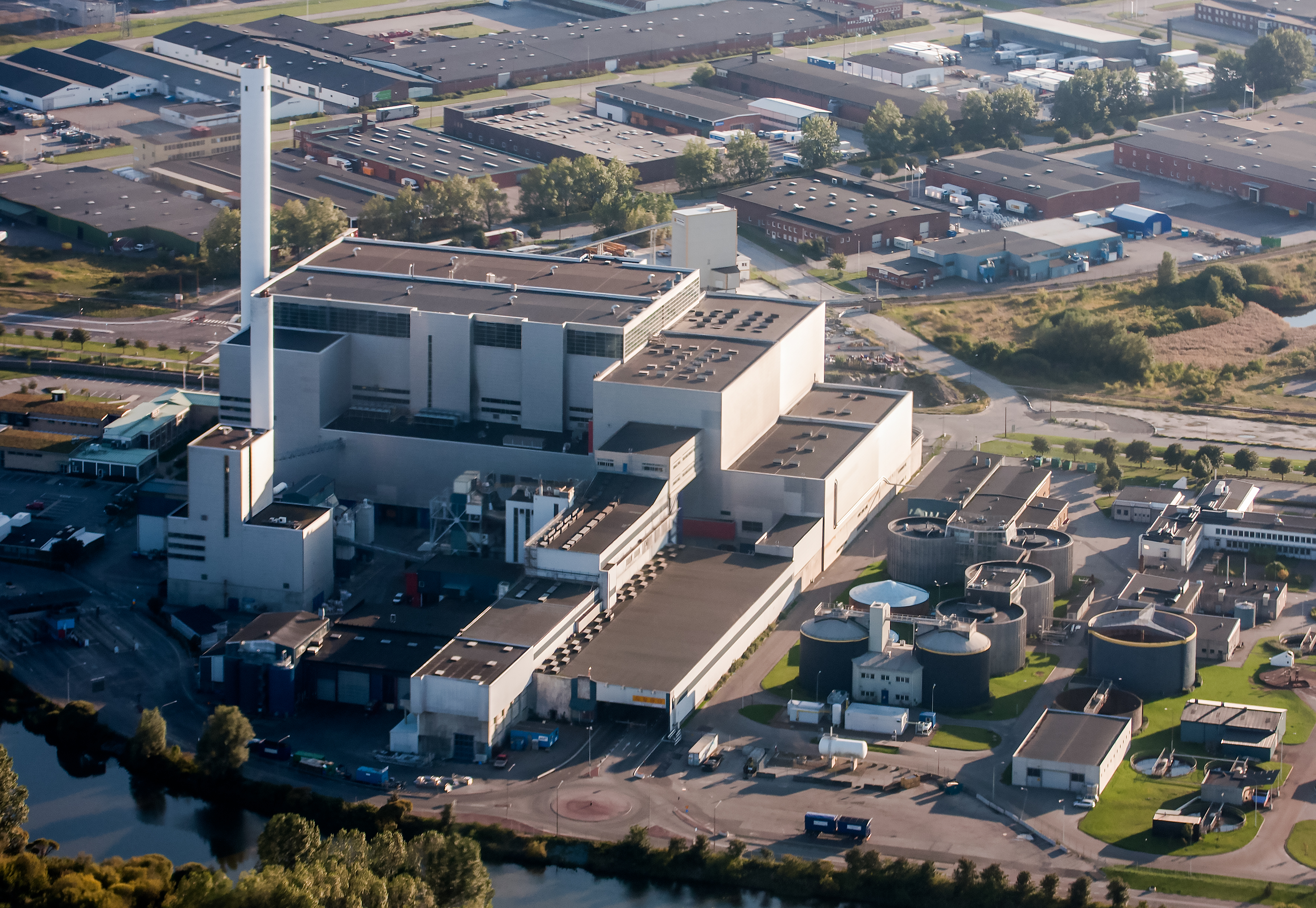
A recycling and waste-to-energy plant for waste that is not exported.

Waste management or waste disposal includes the processes and actions required to manage waste from its inception to its final disposal. This includes the collection, transport, treatment, and disposal of waste, together with monitoring and regulation of the waste management process and waste-related laws, technologies, and economic mechanisms.

Waste management practices are not the same across countries (developed and developing nations); regions (urban and rural areas) and residential and industrial sectors can all take different approaches. Effective waste management can be relatively expensive, with one report estimating that it usually comprises 20%–50% of municipal budgets. In high-income countries, waste management typically includes street collection and transportation to controlled or sanitary landfills, incinerators, or recycling centers. In lower-income countries, practices vary, but a sizable portion of waste is stored in open dumps or openly burned, in addition to more sanitary methods. According to one estimate of global waste, approximately a fourth of all the municipal solid terrestrial waste is not collected, and an additional fourth is mismanaged after collection, often being burned in open and uncontrolled fires – or close to one billion tons per year when combined.

Waste itself and poor waste management methods can pose human health harm and environmental harm by polluting air, water, soil, and food. The aim of waste management is to reduce the adverse effects of waste on human health, the environment, planetary resources, and aesthetics. Waste management deals with all types of waste (whether solid, liquid, or gases), including industrial, chemical, municipal, organic, biomedical, and radioactive wastes. A large portion of waste management practices deal with municipal solid waste (MSW), which is the bulk of the waste that is created by household, industrial, and commercial activity. According to the Intergovernmental Panel on Climate Change (IPCC), municipal solid waste is expected to reach approximately 3.4 Gt by 2050; however, policies and lawmaking can reduce the amount of waste produced in different areas and cities of the world.

Effective 'Waste Management' involves the practice of '7R' - 'R'efuse, 'R'educe', 'R'euse, 'R'epair, 'R'epurpose, 'R'ecycle and 'R'ecover. Amongst these '7R's, the first two ('Refuse' and 'Reduce') relate to the non-creation of waste, such as reducing consumption. The next two ('Reuse' and 'Repair') refer to increasing the usage of the existing product. 'Repurpose' and 'Recycle' involve maximum usage of the materials used in the product, and 'Recover' is the least preferred and least efficient waste management practice involving the recovery of embedded energy in the waste material. For example, burning the waste to produce heat (and electricity from heat).

=== Wastewater facilities ===
Wastewater treatment facilities remove pollutants and contaminants physically and chemically to clean water to be returned to society. The South Gippsland Water Organization breaks down the three steps of waste-water treatment. The primary treatment is to sift through the water to remove large solids to leave oils and small particles in the water. Secondary treatment to dissolve/remove oils, particles, and micro-organisms from the water to be prepared for tertiary treatment to chemically disinfect the water with chlorine or with UV light. “For most industrial applications, a 150,000 GPD capacity WWTS would cost an estimated $500,000 to $1.5 million inclusive of all necessary design, engineering, equipment, installation, and startup”. With such a simple solution that has been proven to clean water to be reused and is relatively inexpensive, there is no excuse why there should not be a waste-water treatment facility in every country, every state, and every town.

==== Benefits ====
“Right now, according to a NASA-led study, many of the world’s freshwater sources are being drained faster than they are being replenished. The water table is dropping all over the world. There's not an infinite supply of water”. There is a need to preserve every resource, every finite water source that we do have left to maintain our lives and lifestyles. Able countries helping under-developed countries with their creation of wastewater treatments benefits society. Another cost of not adding wastewater treatments in countries is that people have no choice but to clean with, cook with, or drink the contaminated water which has caused millions of cases of disease and deaths. “Between 400,000 and 1 million people die each year in developing countries because of diseases caused by mismanaged waste, estimates poverty charity Tearfund”. Society has the means to decrease or even eliminate this way of death and save millions of lives by providing the simple human necessity of clean water.

== Utilization ==
=== Resource recovery ===
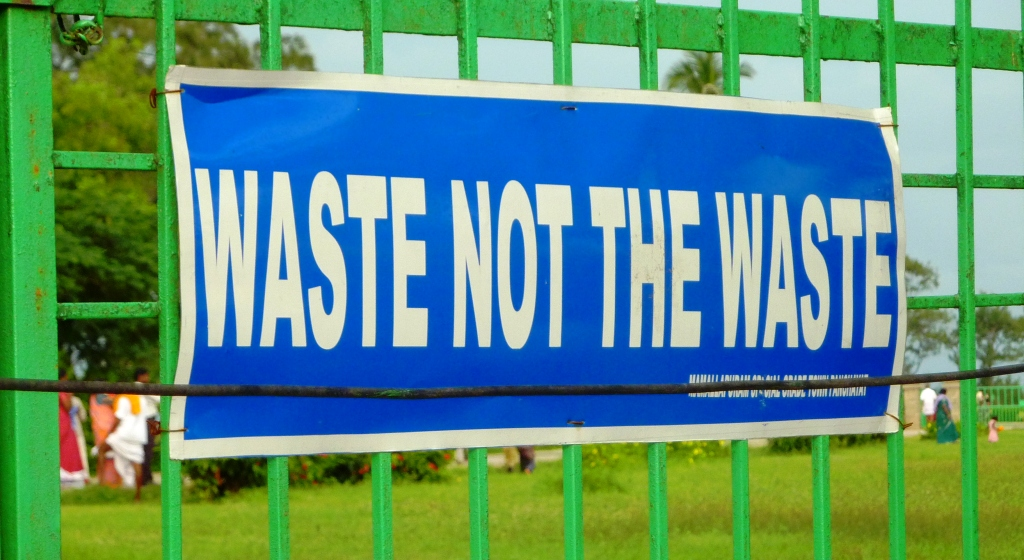
'Waste not the waste' sign in Tamil Nadu, India

Resource recovery is using wastes as an input material to create valuable products as new outputs. The aim is to reduce the amount of waste generated, thereby reducing the need for landfill space, and optimising the values created from waste. Resource recovery delays the need to use raw materials in the manufacturing process. Materials found in municipal solid waste, construction and demolition waste, commercial waste and industrial wastes can be used to recover resources for the manufacturing of new materials and products. Plastic, paper, aluminium, glass and metal are examples of where value can be found in waste.

Resource recovery goes further than just the management of waste. Resource recovery is part of a circular economy, in which the extraction of natural resources and generation of wastes are minimised, and in which materials and products are designed more sustainably for durability, reuse, repairability, remanufacturing and recycling. Life-cycle analysis (LCA) can be used to compare the resource recovery potential of different treatment technologies.

Resource recovery can also be an aim in the context of sanitation. Here, the term refers to approaches to recover the resources that are contained in wastewater and human excreta (urine and feces). The term "toilet resources" has come into use recently. Those resources include: nutrients (nitrogen and phosphorus), organic matter, energy and water. This concept is also referred to as ecological sanitation. Separation of waste flows can help make resource recovery simpler. Examples include keeping urine separate from feces (as in urine diversion toilets) and keeping greywater and blackwater separate.

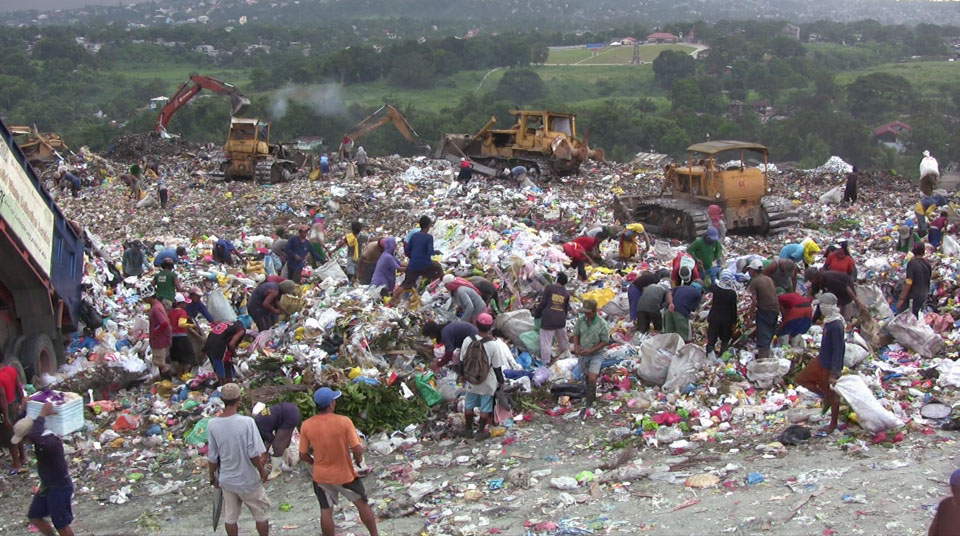
People who earn their living by collecting and sorting garbage and selling them for recycling (waste pickers), Smokey Mountain, Philippines

=== Energy recovery ===
Energy recovery from waste is using non-recyclable waste materials and extracting from it heat, electricity, or energy through a variety of processes, including combustion, gasification, pyrolyzation, and anaerobic digestion. This process is referred to as waste-to-energy.

There are several ways to recover energy from waste. Anaerobic digestion is a naturally occurring process of decomposition where organic matter is reduced to a simpler chemical component in the absence of oxygen. Incineration or direct controlled burning of municipal solid waste reduces waste and makes energy. Secondary recovered fuel is the energy recovery from waste that cannot be reused or recycled from mechanical and biological treatment activities. Pyrolysis involves heating of waste, with the absence of oxygen, to high temperatures to break down any carbon content into a mixture of gaseous and liquid fuels and solid residue. Gasification is the conversion of carbon rich material through high temperature with partial oxidation into a gas stream. Plasma arc heating is the very high heating of municipal solid waste to temperatures ranging from 3,000 to 10,000 °C, where energy is released by an electrical discharge in an inert atmosphere.

Using waste as fuel can offer important environmental benefits. It can provide a safe and cost-effective option for wastes that would normally have to be dealt with through disposal. It can help reduce carbon dioxide emissions by diverting energy use from fossil fuels, while also generating energy and using waste as fuel can reduce the methane emissions generated in landfills by averting waste from landfills.

There is some debate in the classification of certain biomass feedstock as wastes. Crude Tall Oil (CTO), a co-product of the pulp and papermaking process, is defined as a waste or residue in some European countries when in fact it is produced “on purpose” and has significant value add potential in industrial applications. Several companies use CTO to produce fuel, while the pine chemicals industry maximizes it as a feedstock “producing low-carbon, bio-based chemicals” through cascading use.

== Education and awareness ==
Education and awareness in the area of waste and waste management is increasingly important from a global perspective of resource management. The Talloires Declaration is a declaration for sustainability concerned about the unprecedented scale and speed of environmental pollution and degradation, and the depletion of natural resources. Local, regional, and global air pollution; accumulation and distribution of toxic wastes; destruction and depletion of forests, soil, and water; depletion of the ozone layer and emission of "green house" gases threaten the survival of humans and thousands of other living species, the integrity of the earth and its biodiversity, the security of nations, and the heritage of future generations. Several universities have implemented the Talloires Declaration by establishing environmental management and waste management programs, e.g. the waste management university project. University and vocational education are promoted by various organizations, e.g. WAMITAB and Chartered Institution of Wastes Management.

== Gallery ==
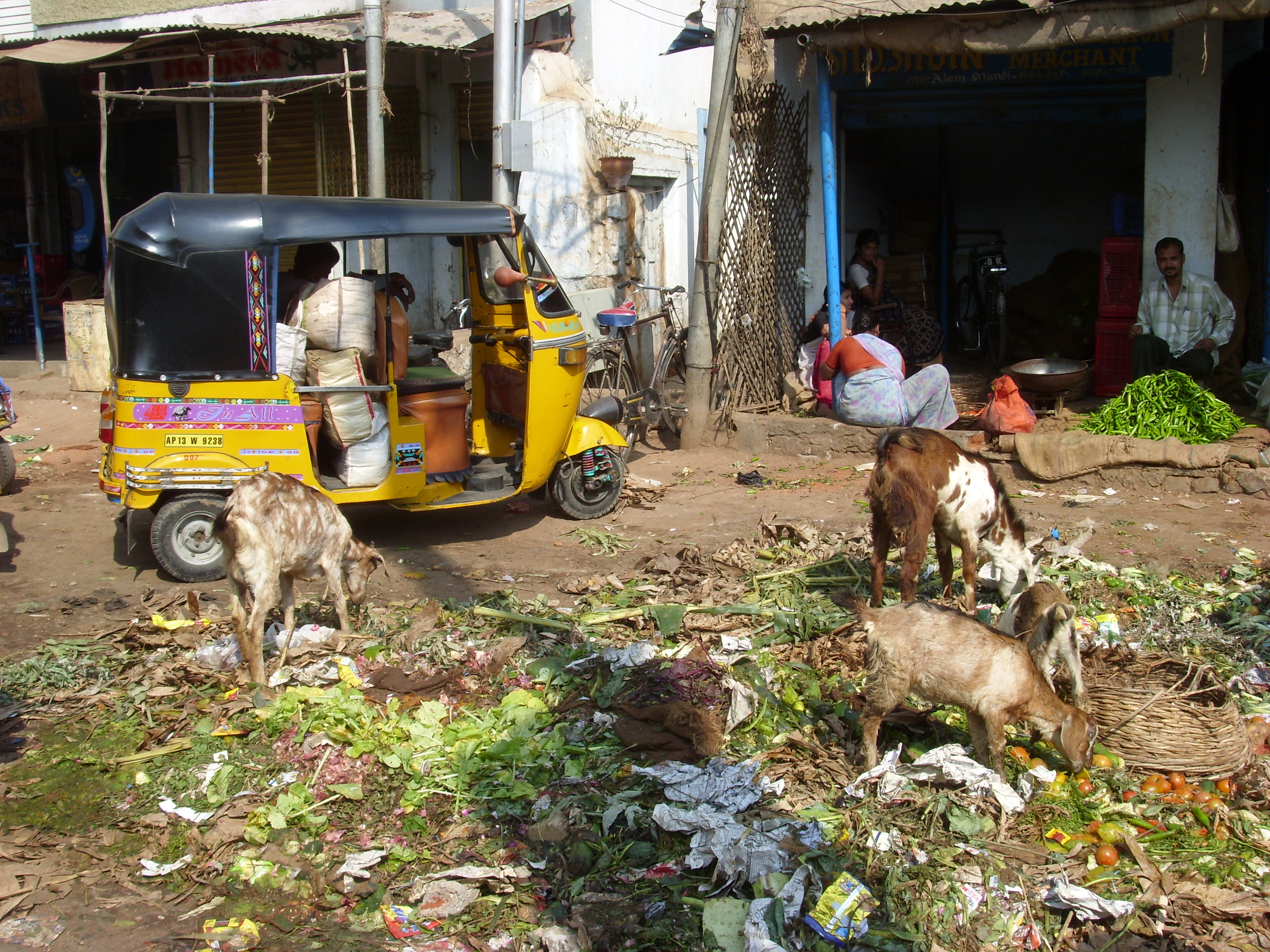
Vegetable waste being dumped in a market in Hyderabad

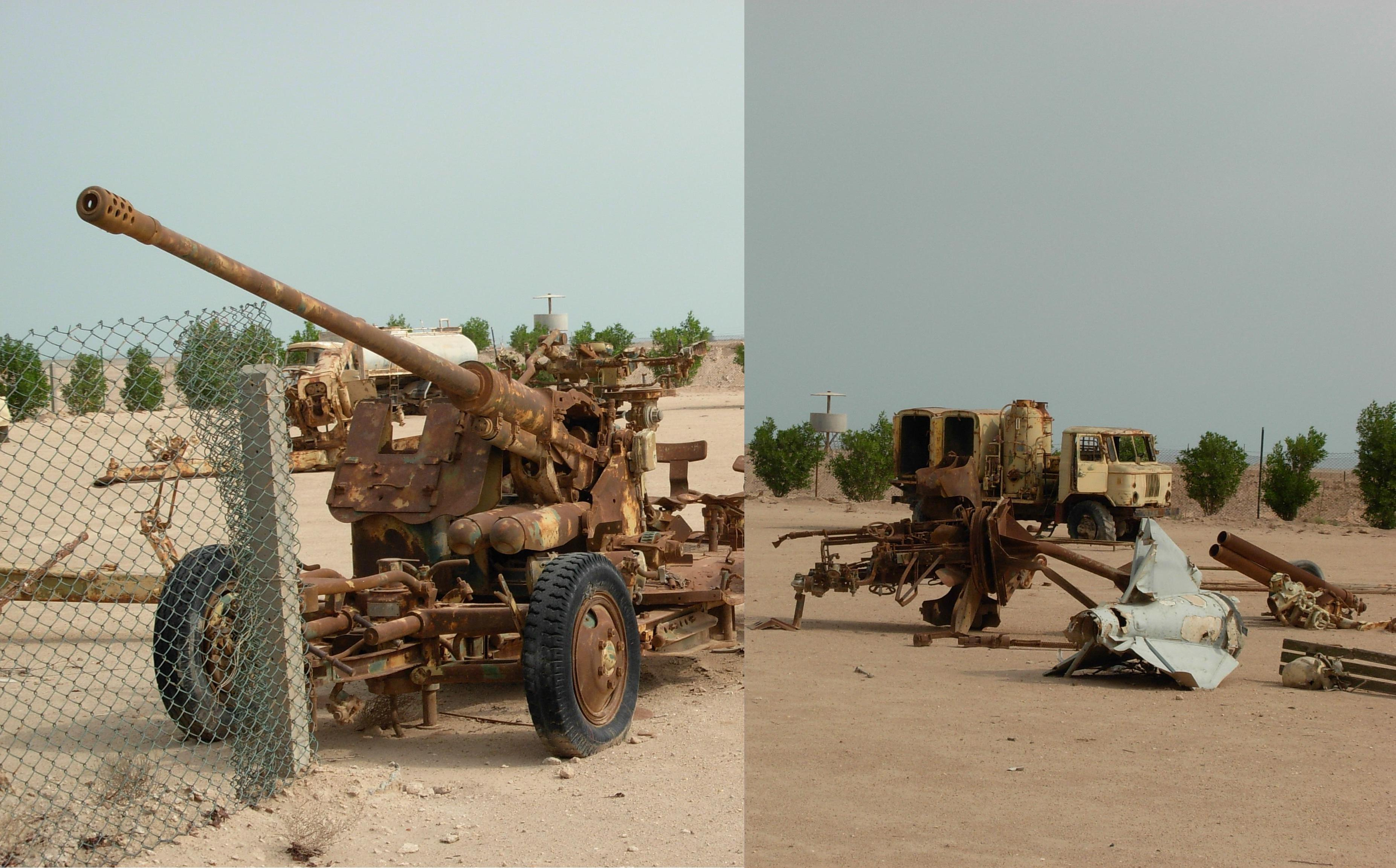
Weapon scraps

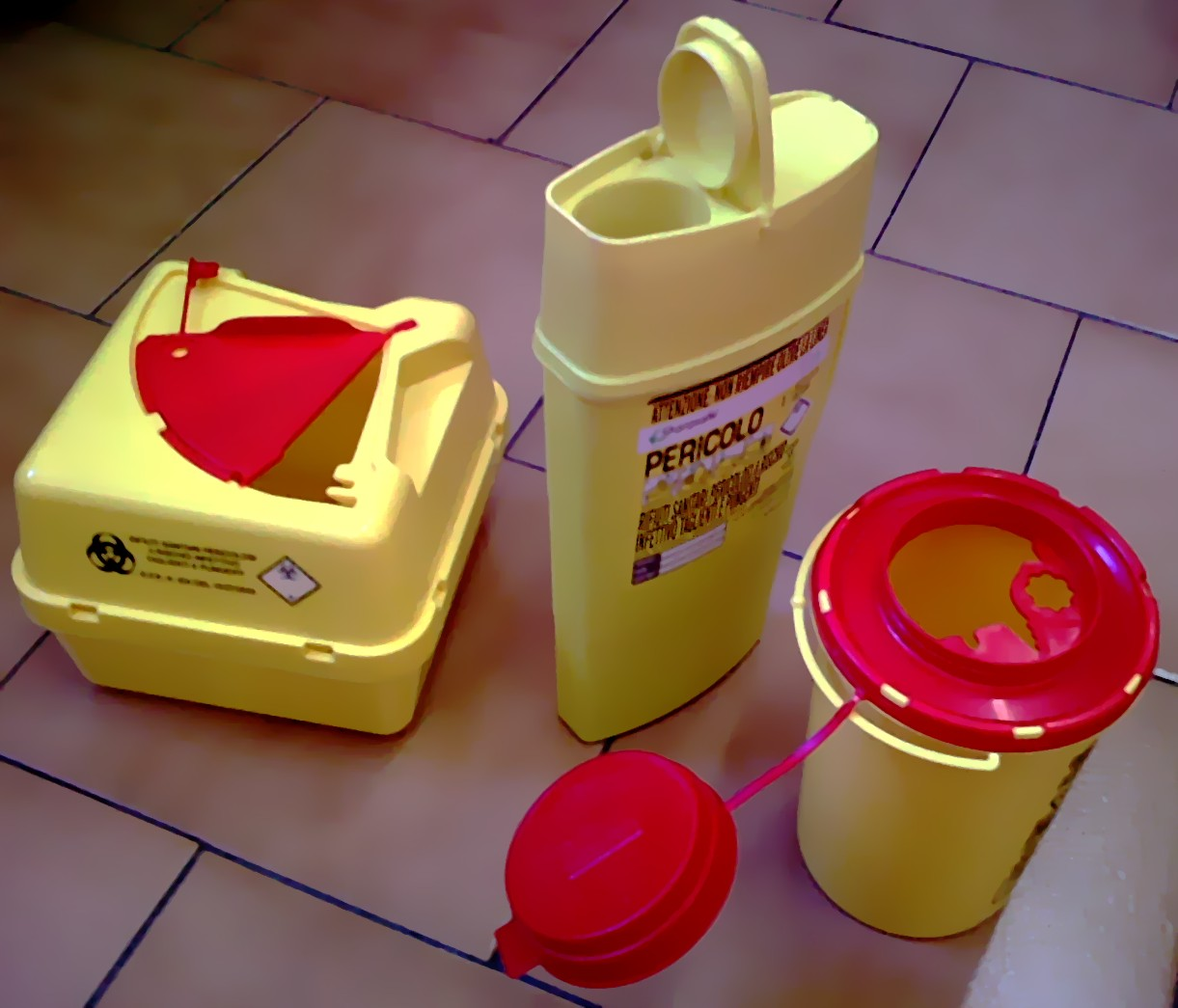
Agobox; Bio-medical Waste

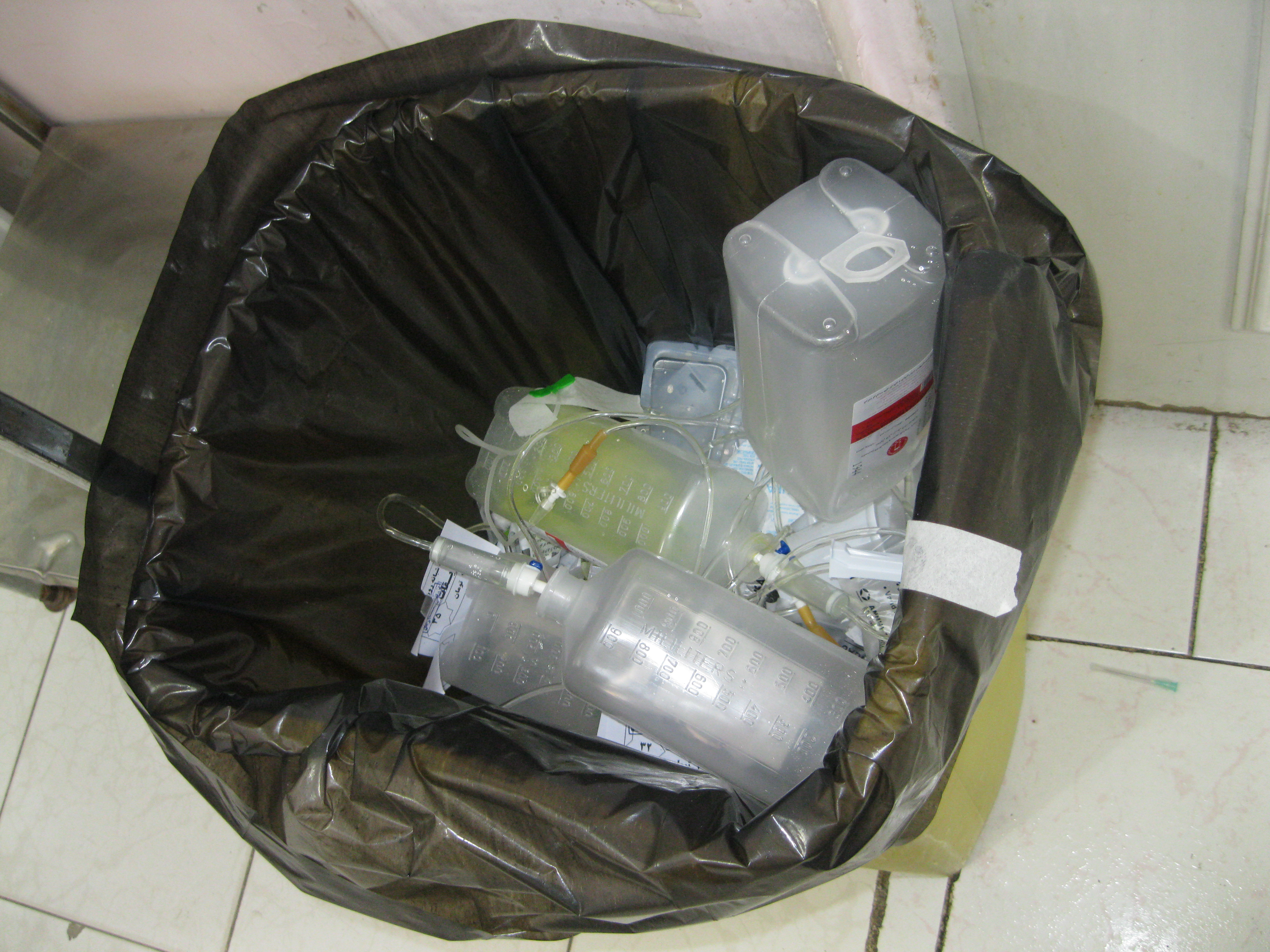
Hospital waste

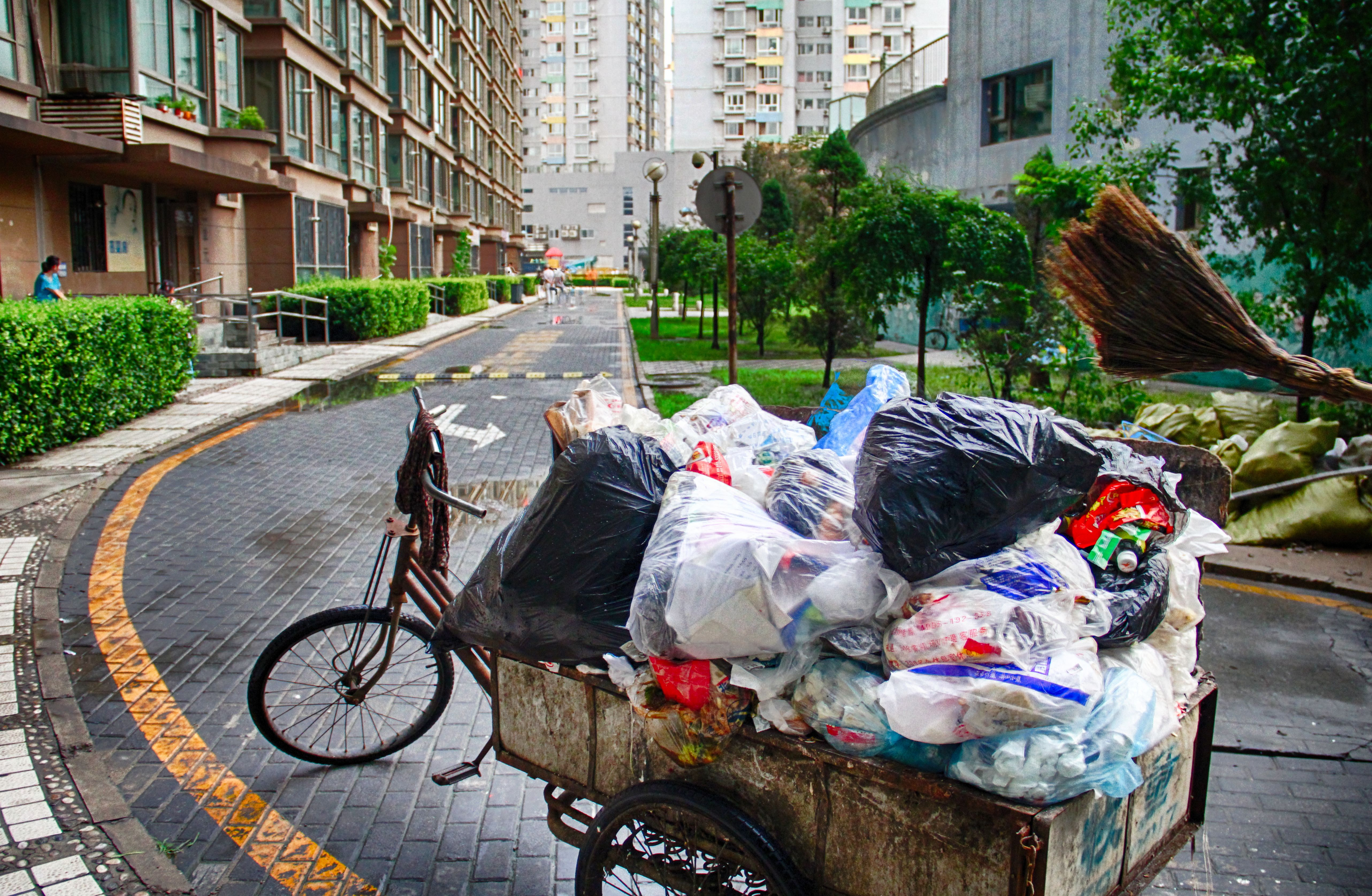
Waste collected in a tricycle

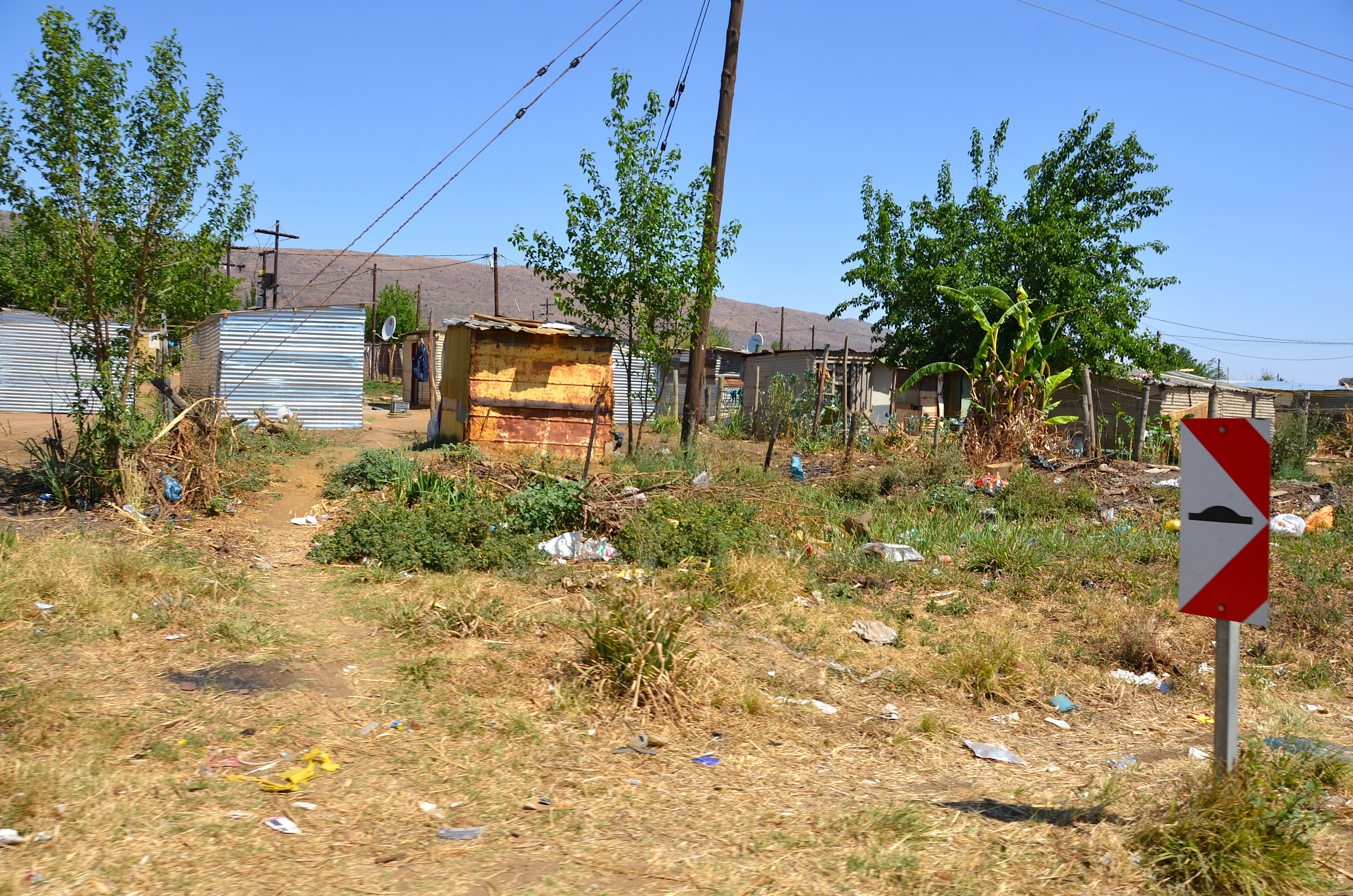
Shacks and littering by illegal immigrants in South Africa

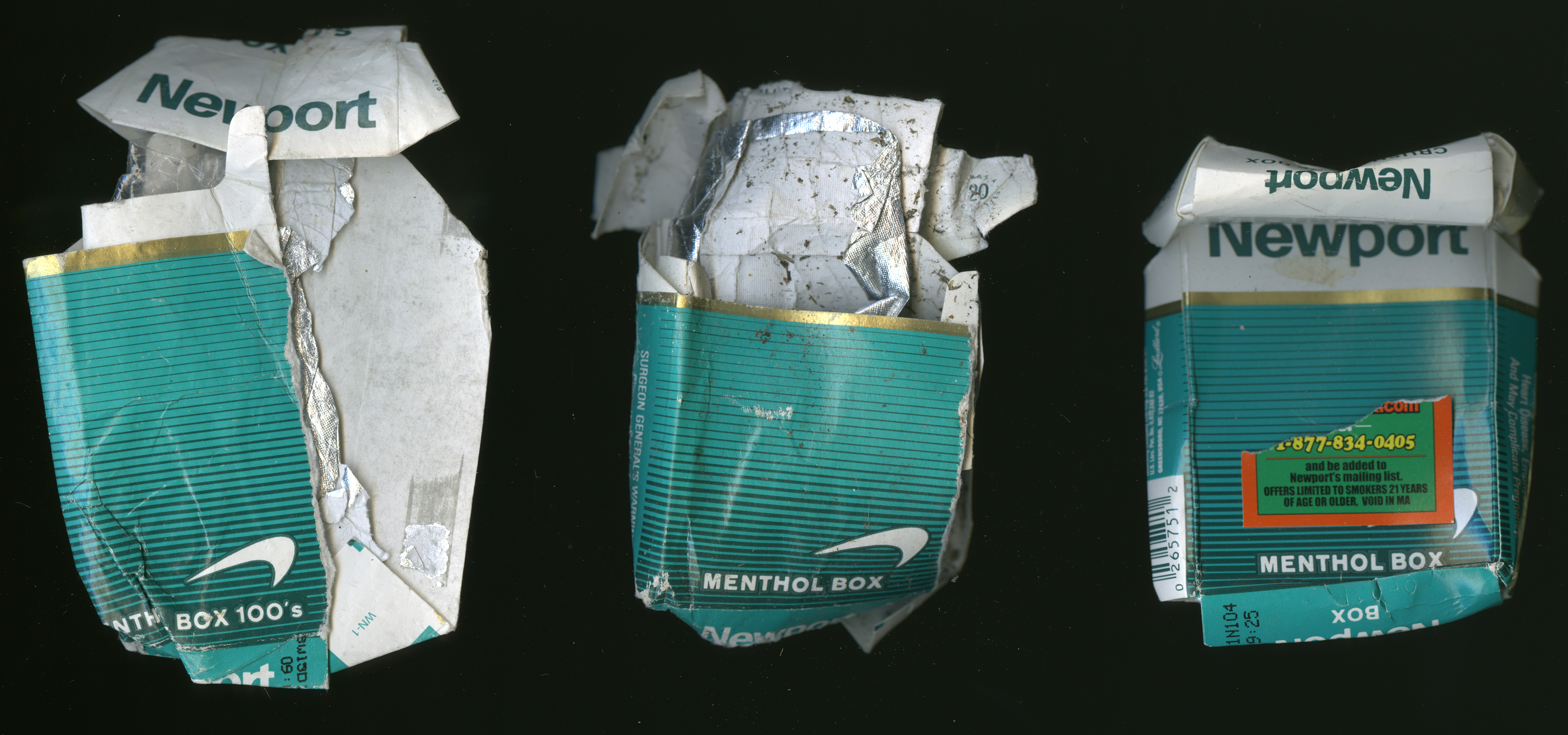
Used cigarette boxes

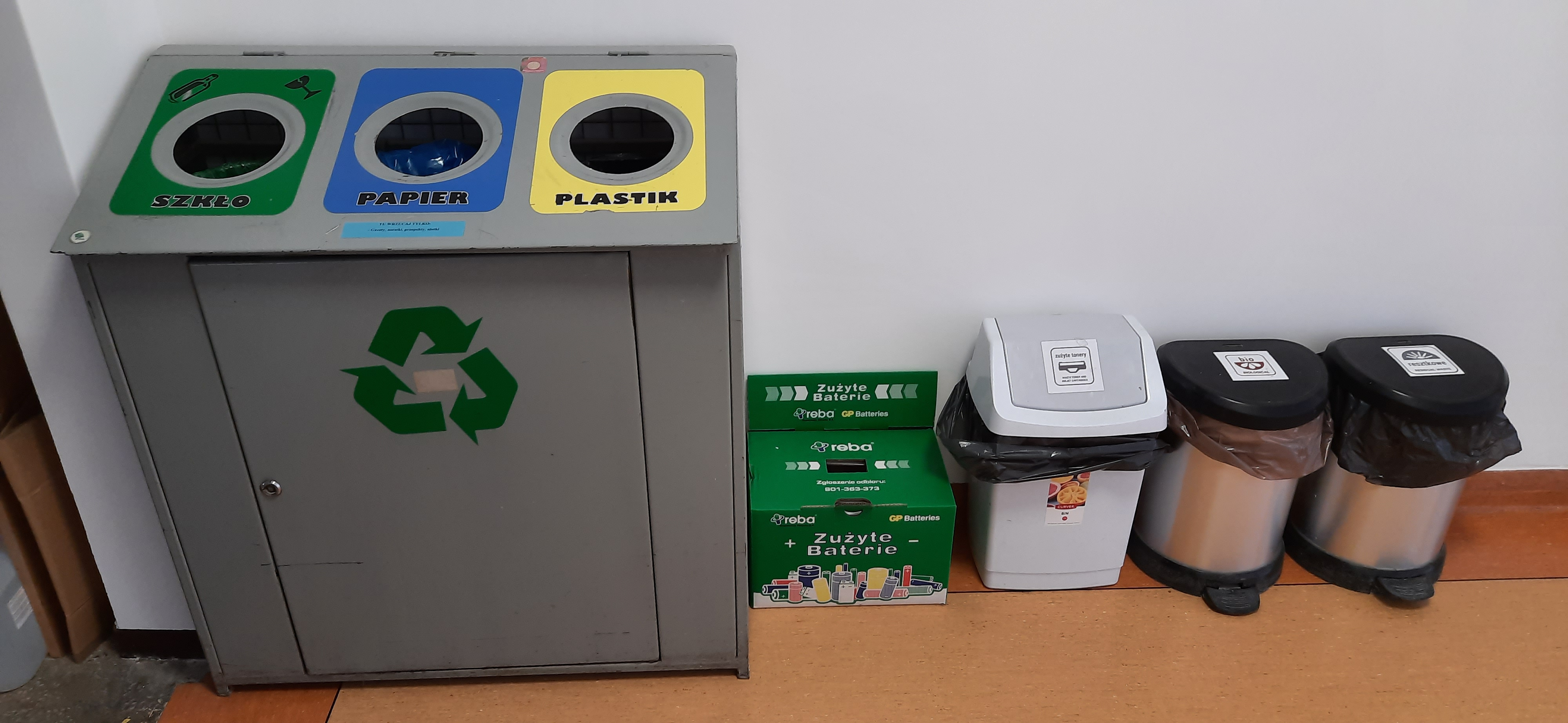
Recycling point at the Gdańsk University of Technology

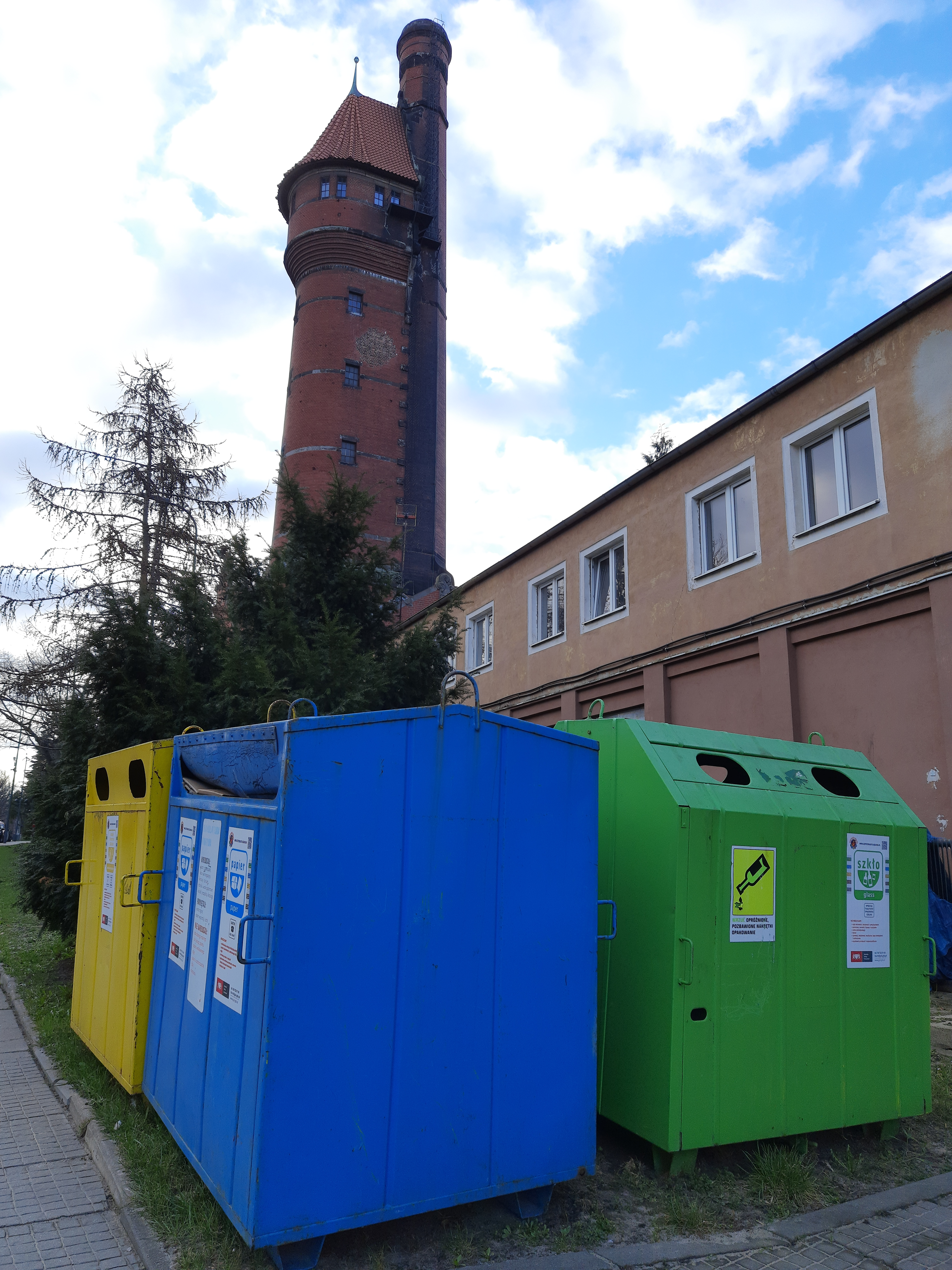
Containers for selective waste collection at the Gdańsk University of Technology

== See also ==
- Biological hazard
- Chemical hazards
- Environmental dumping
- Fly-tipping
- Garbage truck
- Global waste trade
- Human waste
- Landfill gas utilization
- List of waste management acronyms
- Litter
- Midden
- Recycling
- Refuse-derived fuel
- Scrap
- Waste Atlas
- Waste by country
- Waste collection
- Waste converter
- Waste management
- Waste minimisation
- Waste-to-energy plant
