= Waste converter =

Converter equipment
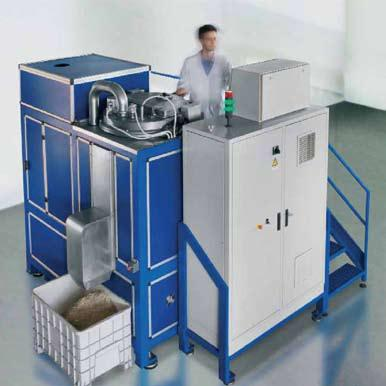
- Example of a modern Converter (H series)
- Uses: Waste Treatment, Sterilization, Refuse Derived Fuel
- Inventor: Gianpiero Morgantini
- Related items: Autoclave

A waste converter is a machine used for the treatment and recycling of solid and liquid refuse material. A converter is a self-contained system capable of performing the following functions: pasteurization of organic waste; sterilization of pathogenic or biohazard waste; grinding and pulverization of refuse into unrecognizable output; trash compaction; dehydration. Because of the wide variety of functions available on converters, this technology has found application in diverse waste-producing industrial segments. Hospitals, clinics, municipal waste facilities, farms, slaughterhouses, supermarkets, ports, sea vessels, and airports are the primary beneficiaries of on-site waste conversion.

The converter is an evolution of the autoclave, invented by Sir Charles Chamberland in 1879, but differs from a waste autoclave in several key characteristics. While the autoclave relies on high temperature and pressure to achieve moist heat sterilization of waste, a converter operates in the atmospheric pressure range. Superheating conditions and steam generation are achieved by variable pressure control, which cycles between ambient and negative pressure within the sterilization cell. The advantage of this updated approach is a safer and less complicated operation that does not require a pressure vessel. Additionally, while autoclaves require external water input, modern converters utilize the moisture content already present in the conversion cell to generate steam sterilization conditions. Any water that is introduced into the process can be recycled in a closed-loop system as opposed to being dumped as run-off sewage. In general, the converter is a simplified, cleaner, and more efficient update to Sir Charles's invention.

Converter technology is an environmentally friendly alternative to other traditional means of waste disposal that include incineration, plasma arc, and landfill dumping in that waste conversion results in a small carbon footprint, avoids polluting emissions into the atmosphere, and results in a usable end product such as biofuel, soil compost, or building material (see also Refuse-derived fuel).

== Applications ==
Application of the converter is common in centralized waste conversion centers, where large machines process waste on an industrial scale. MSW (Municipal solid waste) or infectious waste, depending on the type of plant, is sterilized and converted into a sterilized organic and inorganic, innocuous end-product. Machines used in such large-scale applications process between 1,000 and 4,000 kg of waste per hour. At the end of each cycle, lasting as little as half-hour in Converters (that are capable of grinding), the pulverized, sanitized, and dehydrated product is off-loaded and segregated for other uses. Some of the product is routed for use in pulp production, composting, or refuse-derived fuel.

Applications outside of waste treatment centers are increasingly common due to the portability and simplicity of modern converters. Hospitals are a large beneficiary of converter technology, which allows for the immediate treatment of potentially infected hazardous waste at its source. Hospitals and clinics equipped to have a zero hazardous waste footprint operate by having a converter placed on every floor where single use sanitary items such as needles, scalpels, bandages, and blood bags are immediately converted into innocuous product. In addition to the marked improvement in sanitation, on-site treatment of hazardous waste allows operational cost savings for these facilities. The government of Tuscany, Italy for example calculated an annual figure of 8 Million Euro that was saved by turning to on-site treatment of medical hospital waste.

Supermarkets and food producers (who dump unused food waste in municipal landfills at a rate that is alarming many conservationists) have found a use for converter technology. By processing unused and decomposing food matter together with packaging and other refuse on site, supermarkets have achieved improvements in terms of waste disposal costs. This is in addition to improvements in public perception, which had been seriously critical of the amount of waste sent to landfills by food stores. In the UK alone 6.7 million metric tons of food waste goes into landfills each year, resulting in 8 million metric tons of CO_{2} being emitted.

Farms, slaughterhouses, and other food producers are likewise becoming more involved in on-site waste conversion. Larger installations especially, where garbage hauling is a major and expensive operation, currently have economic and legislative incentives to move towards operating own converters. Recent drives toward environmentally conscious or "green" technologies have even provided government budgets for such installations.

Naval vessels, cruise liners, and off-shore installations such as gas-drilling rigs and oil platforms are another logical application of converter technology. Due to the extended isolation periods of sea-going vessels and off-shore platforms there is an issue of how to store and dispose of refuse in an efficient and sanitary way. Worldwide legislation on sea dumping is strict and does not allow, under stringent penalties, any ships or sea vessels to dump waste, gray water, or even ballast water that has been collected in a remote geographic location due to the danger of biological contamination. Ship-generated waste is either held and disposed of in port waste disposal facilities or can be converted directly on the vessel for easier storage and at times (depending on waste composition) for additional fuel.

== Environmental Impact ==
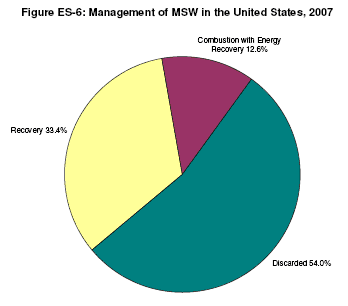
2007 waste recovery

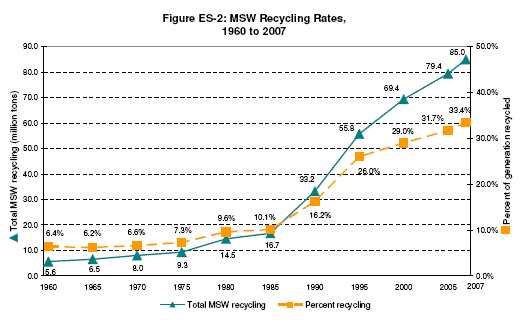
EPA chart: waste generation and waste recovery

The converter is one of the "green technologies" available today for waste treatment. There is a clear and definite positive environmental impact stemming from the use of waste conversion into biofuel, building material, and soil compost. In 2009 ever-increasing numbers of waste exporters around the world are finding it difficult to find buyers for their cargo. Increasing numbers of local and national governments are also turning to recycling and conversion technology to relieve the pressure on already-full or overfilled landfills. Waste conversion, augmented by traditional recycling methods, now allows nearly 99% of all MSW to be reused in some way, thus sharply reducing the demand on landfills.

In 1980 only about 10% on municipal solid waste was recycled, and the product consisted largely of paper and glass recycled material. With the widespread use of autoclaves, that percentage climbed to a significant 45% by the year 2000, when composting and energy recovery became more common. With the evolution of the autoclave and the arrival of converters new uses of converted product are emerging on an ongoing basis. Some application only recently implemented are: Composting and combining with farm fertilizer, building material such as concrete additive, gasification fuel, and furnace/boiler pellet additive. The latter two are energy recovery options that only became acceptable on a large scale once the product was demonstrated to burn cleanly and within EPA emission regulations. A notable fact about energy recovery is that even though some waste was already reused in this way as early as 1980, the current generation of converters produces Biomass Fuel that burns exponentially cleaner than the incinerated waste of those times.

There are environmentally conscious improvements that have been built into the design of converters based on the lessons learned from older technologies. The new machines run on much less power than the large pressure vessel type autoclaves, and can be plugged into 400 V power supplies or run off of a small motor as stand-alone units. As a result of this, a new degree of portability became possible, and now facilities such as hospitals are placing dish-washer sized units in every department. One important advent that allowed for a leaner, green technology is the ability of modern converters to transfer mechanical energy and friction force on the waste mass into heat energy that is used in the pasteurization and sterilization processes.

== Operation ==
A typical treatment cycle will begin with the loading of unsorted waste material and end in the offload of a dry powder (product), which now possesses new characteristics and that the input material did not. The garbage is loaded into a chamber, also the conversion cell, by hand or through the use of a loading elevator or conveyor belt, depending on the application and toxicity/danger level associated with handling the waste. The previous batch of post-treatment product is removed and a new cycle is started through an electronic control panel. Modern converters are fully automatic and will finish the computer controlled cycle autonomously, unless a failure occurs.

The precise conditions needed to achieve pasteurization and sterilization are controlled by a programmable logic controller (PLC) in millisecond intervals. This level of control in modern units has allowed for the simplification of autoclave technology to the point where heavy and potentially dangerous pressure vessels are not needed, and sterilization conditions are reached by depressing the conversion cell and continuing to evaporate moisture from the product under negative pressure. The result is a statistically safer and more reliable machine, which is also smaller and lighter than older autoclaves.

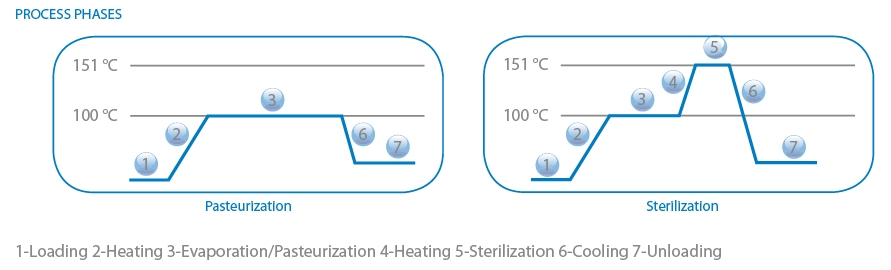
Waste conversion cycle and its phases.

The conversion cycle consists of several sequential steps or phases. The waste is first ground and pulverized to an unrecognizable mixture by a combination of fixed and actuated hardened steel blades. The mixture is then heated through the injection of steam and also by the heat generated by frictional forces of the grinding phase. The exact temperature required to pasteurize, and in the subsequent phase to sterilize the waste, is maintained for a time that allows for an 18 log 10 reduction in microorganisms. In order to eliminate the required amount of microorganisms required by government regulations, a complete saturation of waste matter with superheated steam is required for a minimum amount of time, also regulated by environmental agencies. The modern converter achieves saturation within 10–15 minutes due to the high degree of pulverization preceding the sterilization phase, whereas older models required up to several hours to saturate and sterilize the same load.

The cycle ends in a cooling phase, during which product continues to be dehydrated. Upon reaching temperature at which product is safe to handle, near ambient temperature, the cycle automatically shuts down. The end product is expelled into a tray that can then be hauled off for storage. The entire process and statistics are recorded and stored in computer memory for record keeping.

== Competing Technologies ==
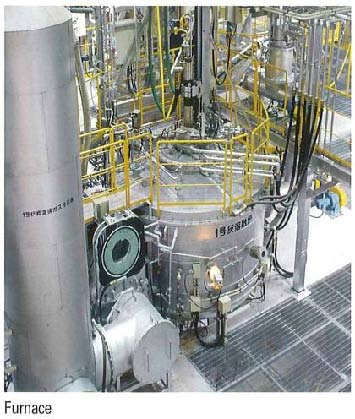
Plasma Arc plant in operation in Japan

Waste converters do have indirect competition since there are many modes of waste disposal available in the market. However, most of the 'competing' technologies can be added into a larger waste conversion process that will usually place the waste converter at the forefront of a supply chain for on-site waste conversion into a sanitized and dehydrated bulk material. Following processing, the bulk material will follow one of several process paths; see Applications section.

Plasma-arc gasification plants are able to process all types of waste under extreme heat that emanates from plasma torches that are in contact with the refuse. Plasma-arc plants produce two types of output; syn-gas, which is collected for use as fuel, and a composite solid that has some properties of plastic and can also be recycled for use in consumer goods. Plasma-arc and gasification plants are highly complex installations and only compete with converter technology at the level of industrial-size converters. The two technologies can still be used in series by sterilizing and lightening waste on-site, before sending it to a gasification plant for syn-gas extraction. This way transportation and storage costs are kept down while maintaining a more sanitary operation. Adding a waste converter at the front-end of a gasification process will theoretically produce less emissions and a cleaner, more usable end product.

Micro-wave and other irradiation sterilization has been used to sterilize bio-hazard material in large quantities, but all such approaches suffer from major drawbacks as compared to converters. Irradiation plants are large installations that are expensive to build and maintain, and must necessarily be hub locations as part of a larger supply chain. There is also a health risk and a danger of exposure to radioactive material in installations that use energy sources for generation of gamma rays and other types of radiation. In general, Micro-wave and Irradiation technology was used to treat hazardous pathogenic waste before the widespread adoption of moist-heat sterilization that both autoclaves and converters use. These solutions have been economically forced out of the mainstream use because of their high complexity and operational costs.

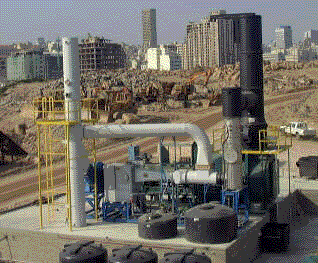
refuse incinerator plant

The introduction of autoclaves was a big step in the direction of widespread treatment of refuse, and so many functional forms of autoclaves are currently in operation at landfills and treatment centers around the world. Some common features of autoclaves that differentiate them from competing technologies are as follows. Autoclaves employ the moist-heat method to sterilize and deactivate refuse in a large pressure vessel where saturated steam is injected. The end product is completely sanitized and even previously bio-hazardous waste can be discarded in a normal municipal landfill. Autoclaves employ the same method of sterilization as converters, but do so using larger and more complex equipment that also has higher safety and energy consumption requirements. In a majority of cases, autoclaves are hub-and-spoke operations requiring regional treatment centers and a supply chain.

Incineration and compaction have traditionally been treatment options and still compete with newer technologies by virtue of having a proven track record. These solutions are widely recognized as obsolete due to their impact on the biosphere; while compaction has nearly no effect on the long-term goal of reducing waste dumping, incineration had been notorious for polluting the atmosphere. While incineration is popular for its ability to recover energy from waste, it has been widely debated and regulated in order to preserve clean air. One solution that had been instituted to update incineration technology is to add converter stations into the supply chain of clean-burning RDF, of refuse-derived fuel. This, along with advanced filtering and condensation scrubbers was able to render energy recovery from waste a feasible and eco-friendly solution.

== Sources ==
https://www.conversionwastecenter.com/

- http://ompeco.com
- http://www.cali.gov.co/
- https://web.archive.org/web/20090504075858/http://www.ecogeek.org:80/content/view/2510/81/
- http://www.ecologicasud.it
- http://www.environmentalleverage.com
- http://www.epa.gov
- http://www.gov.bw/
- http://www.hitechambiente.com/index.asp
- http://www.ms.ro/
- http://www.organicfarming.com.au/
- http://www.smrc.com.au/
- http://www.svswa.org/
- Sterilizzatore "Converter", University of Napoli study by Prof. Paolo Marinelli.
