= Electronic waste in New Zealand =

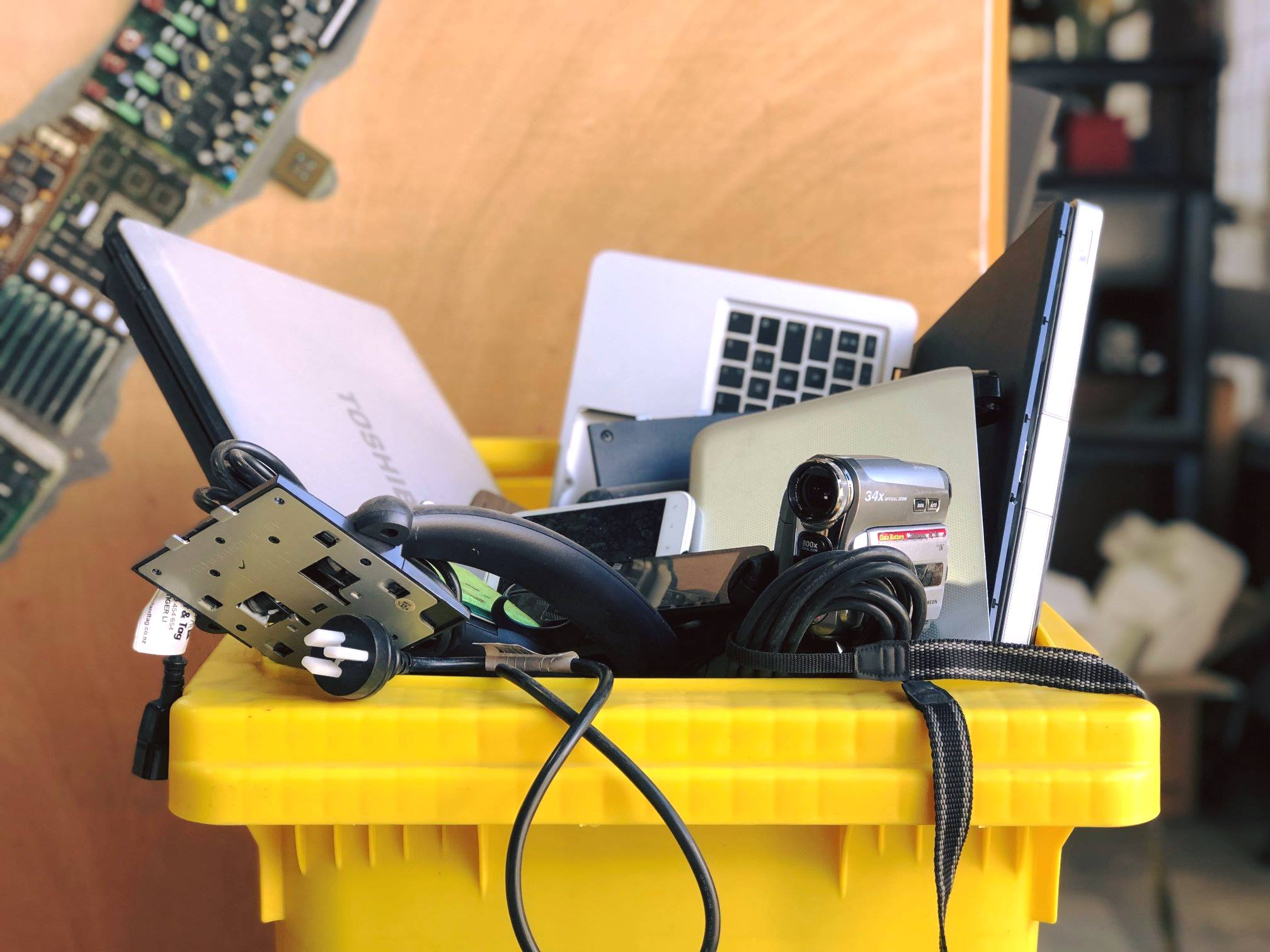
Bin full of E Waste taken at Computer Recycling Ltd, Auckland, New Zealand (2019)

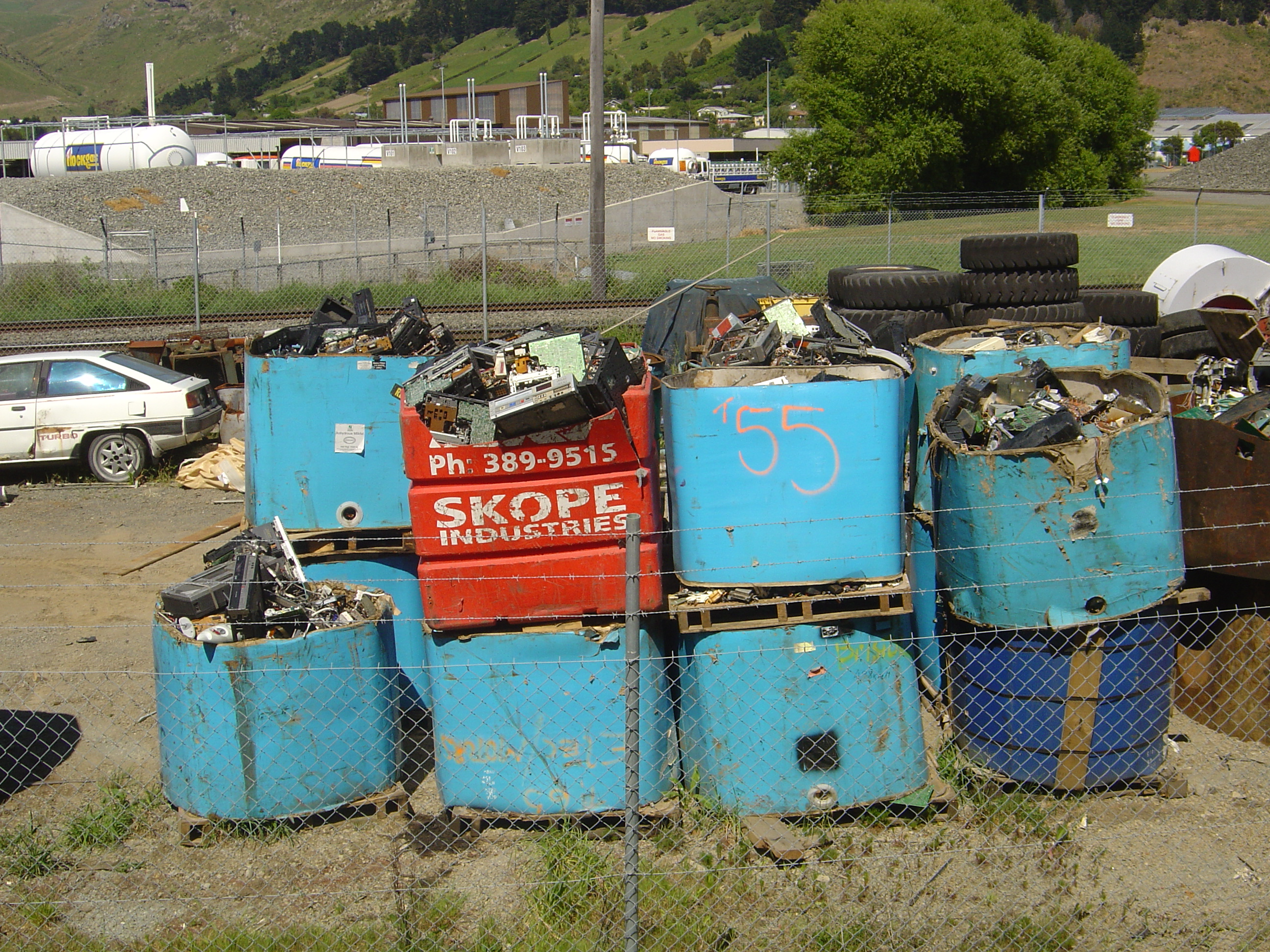
An electronic waste stockpile in Christchurch (2004).

Electronic waste in New Zealand is an environmental issue being addressed by community and government initiatives.

E-waste is the fastest-growing toxic waste stream in New Zealand. Every year, as of 2017, New Zealand generates approximately 99,000 tonnes (20.1 kg per capita) of electronic waste, of which 97,000 tonnes is disposed of in landfills. New Zealand produces among the highest volumes of e-waste in the world while having among the lowest documented recycling rates. It is estimated that by 2030, New Zealand will generate 28.7kg of e-waste per capita without recycling or 27.1kg with recycling initiatives.

In the past, there have been two Government-funded takeback initiatives: the e-Day collections, and the TV takeback campaign. E-waste recycling services provided by local government vary by council with some providing free recycling services, while other councils provide user pays services or rely on the private sector.

New Zealand is the only country in the OECD without a regulated national e-waste scheme. TechCollect NZ has operated a voluntary national collection and recycling scheme since November 2018, providing free drop-off for end-of-life ICT equipment through a retail network primarily comprising Noel Leeming stores nationwide, and funded by industry members. However, producer participation is not mandatory and the scheme operates without the extended producer responsibility framework in place across all other OECD nations. While New Zealand has AS/NZS standards for e-waste recycling practices, these are not mandatory. Government led e-waste recycling initiatives have been historically hampered by a lack of data. In 2020, e-waste was designated as a priority waste stream requiring mandatory product stewardship.

== Background ==
In 2017 the International Telecommunication Union (ITU) noted that New Zealand and Australia produced the highest volumes of e-waste per capita in the world while having amongst the lowest documented rates of recycling. While estimates vary according to methodology, a 2020 UN report estimates New Zealand to produce 19.2kg of e-waste per capita. This is above the OECD average of 17.1kg and more than 2.5 times higher than the world average of 7.3kg. 2% of the generated e-waste is estimated to be diverted from landfill. Approximately 23.9kg of new electronics per capita is put on the New Zealand market every year.

A report produced for the Ministry for the Environment, estimated that New Zealand will generate 28.7 kg of e-waste per capita by 2030 without recycling and 27.1kg with recycling. The largest predicted sources of waste in 2030 without recycling are large household appliances (10.1 kg), information technology and communications equipment (7.1 kg), electrical and electronic tools (3.8kg), consumer equipment (3.6kg) and small household appliances (3.1kg). (Note: See EU legislation for examples of appliances in each category)

=== Public response ===
A 2006 survey showed that two-thirds of respondents were willing to pay for safe disposal of electronic waste such as televisions and computers. The remainder were unwilling to pay anything or were unsure. The survey also showed that 85% were willing to take items to a neighbourhood collection point. A survey conducted on eDay in 2008, found that 26% of respondents attended the recycling event because they needed the space taken up by their old devices.

A case study of 249 Whangarei households conducted in 2018, found that participants were split on who to blame for the electronic waste problem. A slightly larger proportion of households surveyed believed that consumers are not to blame. 57 percent of respondents rated the current national approach to e-waste as poor or very bad.

A 2019 Consumer NZ survey found that 63% of New Zealanders surveyed claimed to be concerned about e-waste.

== Takeback initiatives ==
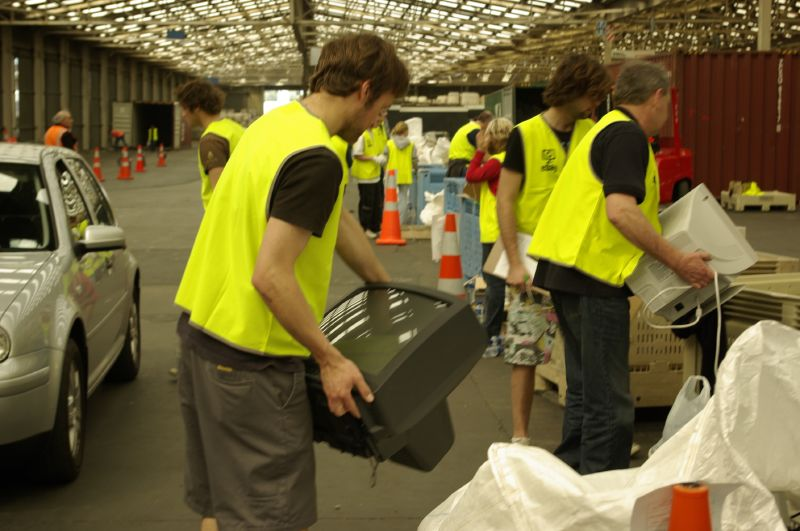
Electronic waste being collected during eDay in Dunedin, 2008

In the past, there have been a number of temporary and targeted recycling initiatives supported by the New Zealand government including eDay and the TV takeback program. No such national government programs are currently running, however there are a number of initiatives by local governments, communities and the private sector.

=== eDay ===
eDay was a nationwide collection programme for electronic waste which ran from 2006 to 2010 in up to 53 different locations. An estimated total of 3200 tonnes of electronic waste were collected and recycled. The 1000 tonnes collected in 2008 equates to approximately 10% of electrical and electronic devices imported in a year and less than 5% of historic electronic waste. The event did not run in 2011 or any subsequent year, because the government ceased to provide funding.

=== CR E-Days ===
As of 2020 E-waste recycler Computer Recycling Ltd facilitates 'CR E-Days' hosted at different community locations in Auckland throughout each year. These are drive-thru electronic waste recycling events, allowing visitors to unload and recycle old, unwanted or broken tech or electronic equipment. Due to community participation in CR E-Days, Computer Recycling has been able to collect and divert over 300,000 kilos of discarded electronic waste otherwise destined for landfill.

=== TechCollect NZ ===
TechCollect NZ Limited is a member-based, not-for-profit organisation established to support the development of an effective regulated product stewardship system for e-products in Aotearoa New Zealand. It has operated a free voluntary national collection and recycling scheme since November 2018, partnering with industry members including major technology companies to fund and deliver services. The scheme collects end-of-life information and communications technology (ICT) equipment through a retail drop-off network primarily comprising Noel Leeming stores, with additional collection points at Warehouse Stationery stores and through partnerships with local councils. Collected equipment is processed through certified recycling partners operating to the AS/NZS 5377 standard for the collection, storage, transport and treatment of end-of-life electrical and electronic equipment.

== Legislation ==
New Zealand does not have national policy, regulation or legislation for e-waste as defined by the UN due to the absence of extended producer responsibility principles in the regulation of e-waste. It is globally among the 60% of countries not covered by such policy, however, is the only country in the OECD. The New Zealand populace is part of the minority (29%) of the world's population not covered by extended producer responsibility policy. There are, however, a number of waste policies in force which impact the generation and disposal of e-waste.

=== International conventions ===
New Zealand signed the Basel Convention in 1989 and ratified it in 1994. The Basel Convention is an international treaty to reduce the movements of hazardous waste between nations, and specifically to prevent transfer of hazardous waste (including e-waste) from developed to less developed countries.

It was not until 2006 that the first application was made for export of hazardous waste under the Basel Convention.

=== Waste Minimisation Act ===
The main legislation which regulates e-waste is the Waste Minimisation Act 2008 which enables the provision of voluntary and mandatory product stewardship programmes, introduced levies on waste sent to landfills and distributes the raised funds to waste minimisation projects via the Waste Minimisation Fund. Product stewardship programmes are developed jointly by industry and government and place the responsibility for managing the life cycle of a product with the manufacturer, importer, retailer and user of the product. These programmes aim to shift the environmental costs of waste arising from the products from the taxpayer and consumer primarily to the producer such that the end of life of a product is considered in the producer's design and business decisions.

A 2015 report commissioned by the Ministry for the Environment, found that there was insufficient data about the e-waste stream to satisfy the requirements of the Waste Minimisation Act for priority product designation. The act requires the Minister for the environment to be confident that waste stream causes "significant environmental harm" or that there are benefits from recycling the waste stream. The majority of stakeholders consulted on behalf of the Ministry for the Environment supported priority product designation for all e-waste in the European Union categories except automatic dispensers. Support was more marginal for toys, leisure, sports and medical equipment. Consultations with the general public in 2019 found that 96% of submitters that stated a position on priority product designation for e-waste supported the measure.

In June 2020, Associate Minister for the Environment Eugenie Sage announced that electronic waste would be one of the six new products to be classified as a priority product. This declaration requires a product stewardship scheme to be developed and accredited under the Act as soon as practicable, and enables regulations to be made allowing the sale of priority products only through an accredited scheme.

From July 2020 to May 2023, TechCollect NZ led a government-supported co-design process to develop scheme framing and design recommendations for a regulated e-product stewardship scheme, with input from a wide range of industry, government and community stakeholders through the Circular E-Stewards Network. The recommendations, published in two reports in 2023, proposed a nationally consistent scheme covering all e-product categories defined under the European WEEE Directive, funded by an Advanced Stewardship Fee applied to products placed on the New Zealand market. TechCollect NZ has applied for accreditation as the national scheme manager under the Waste Minimisation Act 2008, with an independent assessment complete and ministerial advice pending as of 2026.

Despite no mandatory product stewardship for e-waste, schemes may apply for voluntary accreditation under the Waste Minimisation Act 2008. As of 2025, no e-waste schemes hold government accreditation. The Ministry for the Environment's current list of accredited schemes covers other product categories including Cool-Safe, Envirocon, Filter Disposal Services, Glass Packaging Forum, Agrecovery, Interface ReEntry Programme, PaintWise, the Soft Plastic Recycling Scheme, and Tyrewise.

=== Consumer Guarantees Act ===
As a result of the Consumer Guarantees Act, all goods sold in New Zealand have an implicit guarantee requiring them to be reasonably durable. If this guarantee is broken, manufacturers must either repair or replace the goods. Manufacturers must also take 'reasonable action' to ensure the availability of repair facilities and spare parts for a 'reasonable' period following the sale of the goods unless the consumer is notified at the time of purchase that repair or spare parts are not available. If the guarantee regarding spare parts and repair facilities is not met, the manufacturer must again repair or replace the goods.

A 2022 investigation by Consumer NZ, found that cheaper food mixers under The Warehouse and Kmart brands returned under warranty with a simple fault (a disconnected wire) were sent to landfill without attempts to perform a repair. A more expensive mixer by Breville was sent for repair and subsequently resold as a refurbished product at a fraction of the original price, while a Kenwood/De'Longhi mixer was recycled.

== Government & Private Industry initiatives ==
In 2010, $400,000 was allocated towards setting up collection depots and recycling centres around New Zealand.

In 2021, Computer Recycling Ltd brought the first-of-its-kind BLUBOX e-waste technology to Aotearoa. The machine is one of eight in the world and was switched on for the first time at Computer Recycling in Penrose on April 21 with the help of the Hon. David Parker, Minister for the Environment. The technology shreds and sorts e-waste in an enclosed negative pressure system, recovering up to 90 percent of components. The BLUBOX project was supported by the Ministry for the Environment, who provided $1.5million towards the project in the form of a grant from The Waste Minimisation Fund - Te Pūtea Whakamauru Para.

== Export ==
Only e-waste destined for scrapping is monitored under the Basel Convention, so it is not possible to determine the total amount of e-waste exported. In 2020, New Zealand companies under the Basel Convention exported approximately 19,000 tons of e-waste primarily to South Korea (98%) with the remainder sent to Japan and Belgium. The countries are not likely to be the end destination for all the components and materials of the exported e-waste. As of December 2022, there are active permits permitting 35,000 tons of e-waste exports under the Basel Convention.

== See also ==
- Electronic waste by country
- Computer recycling
- E-Cycling
- Waste in New Zealand
