= Waste management law =

Area of law regarding waste

Waste management laws govern the transport, treatment, storage, and disposal of all manners of waste, including municipal solid waste, hazardous waste, and nuclear waste, among many other types. Waste laws are generally designed to minimize or eliminate the uncontrolled dispersal of waste materials into the environment. When left unregulated, these dispersals can cause ecological or biological harm. Most waste management laws are designed to reduce the generation of waste and promote or mandate waste recycling. Waste management laws also regulate organic waste disposal, including composting which is increasingly being recognized as a more sustainable alternative to landfilling and incineration. Regulatory efforts include classifying waste types, setting standards for transport, treatment, storage, and disposal, and establishing enforcement mechanisms.

== History ==
Waste management laws originated in the 19th century as public health measures, addressing sanitation and disease prevention in growing cities. By the mid-20th century, industrialization and new waste streams, like hazardous and electronic waste, prompted more comprehensive regulations, including the U.S. Resource Conservation and Recovery Act (RCRA) of 1976 and the EU's Waste Framework Directive. International agreements like the Basel Convention (1989) further addressed global concerns over hazardous waste trade. Today, waste laws increasingly focus on recycling, composting, and climate-related goals like reducing landfill emissions and promoting circular economies.

== Waste determination ==
Waste determination is the process of classifying a particular material as "waste" subject to regulation. The classification can be complex, such as determining whether a material qualifies as "hazardous waste" under the U.S. Resource Conservation and Recovery Act.

Determining whether a material qualifies as a specific type of waste influences how it must be handled moving forward. For example, in the United States, non-hazardous municipal solid waste may be sent to a landfill, whereas used motor oil is classified as hazardous and cannot be disposed of in landfills. Instead, it is subject to stricter handling, storage, treatment, and disposal requirements. In the United Kingdom, the government provides technical guidance on waste assessment and classification through a reference manual, known as WM3, which covers all UK waste classifications.

Many other wastes may have their own specific definitions and handling requirements. Electronic waste (e-waste), which includes discarded computers, phones, and batteries, is regulated separately in a number of jurisdictions due to the presence of toxic heavy metals. Similarly, food waste is increasingly being classified under organic waste regulations, with some regions incentivizing or mandating its diversion from landfills through composting and anaerobic digestion (AD). In each case a "waste stream" may be identified - waste is generated when a previously useful item is discarded or abandoned, and then flows through various designated treatment, recycling, and storage processes before reaching its final disposal site.

== Disposal standards ==
Disposal standards regulate the permissibility, methods, and locations for waste disposal. Such standards are designed to protect human health, well-being, and environmental values. Various methods are used to control waste disposal.

Waste disposal may be entirely restricted through a disposal ban. The most common and widespread example of this is a prohibition on littering. In jurisdictions where a specific place or system for trash collection is authorized, the deposition of trash anywhere else may result in civil or criminal penalties. More specific disposal bans - ranging from the prohibition of pouring paint down drains, to the designation of national repositories for radioactive waste - govern the final disposal of various waste types. Additionally, some waste materials must be separated for recycling, rather than disposal. These prohibitions are generally conditional, as they do not usually completely ban the disposal of materials, but instead regulate where and how they can be discarded.

Waste disposal also may be conditionally restricted by requiring that waste undergo specific treatment before it can be disposed of in a particular location. One such program is the United States Environmental Protection Agency's Land Disposal Restrictions under the Resource Conservation and Recovery Act Subtitle C Hazardous Waste Management Program. These rules prohibit the land disposal (primarily in landfills) of hazardous waste without prior approved treatment.

The "disposal prohibition" states that hazardous waste cannot be disposed on land until it has been treated to meet specific characteristics, such as acceptable levels of flammability, corrosivity, reactivity, and toxicity, or until it has undergone an approved treatment method. The "dilution prohibition" prohibits the addition of large amounts of water, soil, or non-hazardous waste to a load of hazardous waste as a means of avoiding required treatment. The "storage prohibition" allows waste to be stored only for the purposes of accumulating it for treatment, rather than indefinitely storing it to avoid treatment requirements.

Specific standards may also be established for the construction and operation of waste disposal facilities. For example, landfills may be required to:

- Adhere to location restrictions to avoid geological faults or wetlands
- Install liner and collection systems to minimize groundwater contamination from leachate
- Implement operational policies to minimize dust and other contaminants
- Install methane removal or collection systems to manage landfill gas
- Be properly covered and closed upon decommissioning
- Operate environmental monitoring systems to ensure ongoing compliance

== Environmental impact of waste management laws ==
Waste management laws play a critical role in reducing the harmful environmental impacts caused by improper handling and disposal of waste. These laws are designed in ways to ensure that waste is being properly managed, recycled and reused, and finally, disposed of. They also minimize the negative impacts on human health and overall sustainability through:

=== Pollution prevention ===
- Air Pollution: Improper waste disposal, particularly in open dumps or poorly managed landfills can result in the release of harmful gases like methane, carbon dioxide, and volatile organic compounds (VOCs). Methane, one of the most potent greenhouse gases, is often released from organic waste decomposing anaerobically in landfills. Waste management laws, such as those requiring landfill gas collection systems, or waste-to-energy technologies, help mitigate these emissions and reduce air pollution.
- Water Pollution: Leachate, a liquid that forms when water breaks down, can contaminate water sources if not properly contained. Waste management laws and regulations that require landfill liners and leachate collection systems prevent the leakage of toxic substances into rivers, lakes, and groundwater. The Clean Water Act in the U.S., for example, includes a number of provisions for regulating the discharge of pollutants from waste disposal facilities into water systems.
- Soil Pollution: Hazardous chemicals like heavy metals, polychlorinated biphenyls (PCBs), and persistent organic pollutants (POPs), can leach into the soil from improperly managed waste sites. Laws that regulate the disposal of hazardous waste and mandate safe treatment and storage prevent such contamination. The Resource Conservation and Recovery Act (RCRA) in the U.S. sets such standards for the disposal of hazardous waste, ensuring it doesn't contaminate the soil.

=== Ecological and biodiversity protection ===
Improper waste disposal such as littering and illegal dumping, can destroy animal and plant habitats and pollute ecosystems. Plastics, for example, are known to harm wildlife, often leading to entanglement and ingestion, which can lead to injury or death. The Basel Convention on the Control of Transboundary Movements of Hazardous Waste seeks to protect the environment and human health from the effects of hazardous waste disposal including risks to biodiversity. Many waste management laws also include provisions for environmental impact assessments (EIAs), which are designed to evaluate potential environmental consequences of waste management activities. They work to ensure that operations do not negatively affect local wildlife.

=== Climate change mitigation ===
Waste management laws can directly impact efforts to combat climate change. By reducing the amount of waste sent to landfills and promoting and incentivizing recycling and composting initiatives, these laws help decrease greenhouse gases emitted from landfills. Furthermore, laws that promote these initiatives reduce the need for raw materials, which in turn lowers emissions associated with the extraction and processing of those materials. Laws that promote the use of waste-to-energy (WTE) systems, such as those in many European countries, convert municipal solid waste into electricity or heat, helping reduce the reliance on fossil fuels. This can directly contribute to carbon emission reduction rules.

=== Public health benefits ===
Unregulated waste can lead to a variety of public health issues, including the spread of diseases through contaminated water and the inhalation of toxic fumes from improperly managed waste sites. Many waste management laws specifically focus on regulating the storage and disposal of medical waste. For instance, the Medical Waste Tracking Act in the U.S. ensures that medical waste is handled safely to prevent the spread of infections and illnesses. Many laws also mandate the safe disposal and treatment of hazardous waste, which can be extremely harmful to human health. These laws protect communities from exposure to harmful toxins, reducing the likelihood of neurological damage and cancer associated with waste contamination.

== Around the world ==
=== International law ===
International law includes agreements related to international transport and disposal of waste. These agreements establish baseline regulations for waste handling and international transfer, influencing national waste policies and enforcement measures.

- Convention on Civil Liability for Damage Caused during Carriage of Dangerous Goods by Road, Rail, and Inland Navigation Vessels (CRTD), Geneva, 1989
- Convention on the Control of Transboundary Movements of Hazardous Wastes and their Disposal, Basel, 1989
- Convention on the Ban of the Import into Africa and the Control of Transboundary Movements and Management of Hazardous Wastes Within Africa, Bamako, 1991
- Convention on the Prior Informed Consent Procedure for Certain Hazardous Chemicals and Pesticides in International Trade, Rotterdam, 1998
- Convention on the Transboundary Effects of Industrial Accidents, Helsinki, 1992
- European Agreement Concerning the International Carriage of Dangerous Goods by Inland Waterways (AND), Geneva, 2000
- European Agreement Concerning the International Carriage of Dangerous Goods by Road (ADR), Geneva, 1957
- FAO International Code of Conduct on the Distribution and Use of Pesticides, Rome, 1985
- Minamata Convention on Mercury, Minamata, 2013
- Stockholm Convention Stockholm Convention on Persistent Organic Pollutants Stockholm, 2001
- Convention to Ban the Importation into Forum Island Countries of Hazardous and Radioactive Wastes and to Control the Transboundary Movement and Management of Hazardous Wastes within the South Pacific Region, Waigani, 1995

=== China ===
- China RoHS
- Solid Waste Environmental Pollution Prevention Law (2020)
- Cleaner Production Promotion Law (2003)
- Circular Economy Promotion Law (2018)

=== India ===
- Environment Protection Act (1986)
- Solid Waste Management Rules (2016)
- Hazardous and Other Wastes (Management and Transboundary Movement) Rules (2016)
- Plastic Waste Management Rules (2016)
- Municipal and Solid Waste (Management and Handling) Rules (2000)
- Bio-Medical Waste Management Rules (2016)
- Swachh Bharat Mission (2014)

=== European Union ===
- Battery Directive
- Landfill Directive
- Waste Framework Directive (as revised, 20 October 2008)
- Waste Incineration Directive
- WEEE Directive
- Hazardous Waste Regulations (2005), revised 2009

=== United Kingdom ===
UK waste legislation is derived predominantly from EU governance and transposed into UK law via statutory instruments.

- Animal By-Products Regulations (ABPR)
- Best practicable environmental option (BPEO)
- Certificate of Technical Competence (COTC)
- Control of Pollution Act
- Environment Act 1995
- Environmental impact assessment
- Environmental Protection Act 1990
- Landfill Allowance Trading Scheme (LATS)
- Landfill in the UK
- Landfill tax
- Landfill tax regulations
- Statutory recycling targets
- Waste (England and Wales) Regulations 2011, as amended in 2012, transposing the Waste Framework Directive into UK law
- Waste Management Licensing Regulations

UK waste management facilities must register for one or more of 28 standard permits or apply for an exemption from licensing. Individuals or organizations that transport waste are required to obtain a waste carrier license. Additionally, producers of hazardous waste must register as hazardous waste producers if they generate more than 500 kilograms per year.

The 2011 regulations were amended in 2012 following legal claims from the Campaign for Real Recycling, which argued that the directive had not been properly transposed into the law of England and Wales. On March 6, 2013, Mr Justice Hickinbottom ruled that the 2012 amended regulations successfully fulfilled the requirements of the European Commission's revised Waste Framework Directive.

The 2020 EU–UK Trade and Cooperation Agreement includes "reciprocal commitments" by both parties to "not reduce the level of environmental or climate protection or fail to enforce its laws in a manner that has an effect on trade." These commitments extend to laws related to waste management.

=== United States ===
- Resource Conservation and Recovery Act (RCRA) – One of the main pieces of Legislation regarding municipal solid waste, hazardous wastes, and disposal issues.
- Comprehensive Environmental Response, Compensation, and Liability Act (CERCLA) "Superfund"
- Medical Waste Tracking Act
- National Environmental Policy Act (NEPA) – Established the Environmental Protection Agency, set out requirements for Environmental Impact Reporting for various kinds of development.

US Regulatory bodies include:

- United States Environmental Protection Agency (EPA) - regulates generation and disposal of hazardous waste
- United States Department of Transportation (DOT) - regulates transportation of hazardous waste
- Nuclear Regulatory Commission (NRC) - regulates nuclear waste

In addition to laws implementing or advancing portions of the US laws, some US states have enacted notable laws on other waste and environmental subjects.

- California Proposition 65 "The Safe Drinking Water and Toxic Enforcement Act of 1986" - a 1986 California initiative prohibiting the discharge of toxic substances into drinking water sources
- Electronic Waste Recycling Act - a 2003 California law regarding disposal of consumer electronic wastes
