= Waste in New Zealand =

Environmental issue in New Zealand

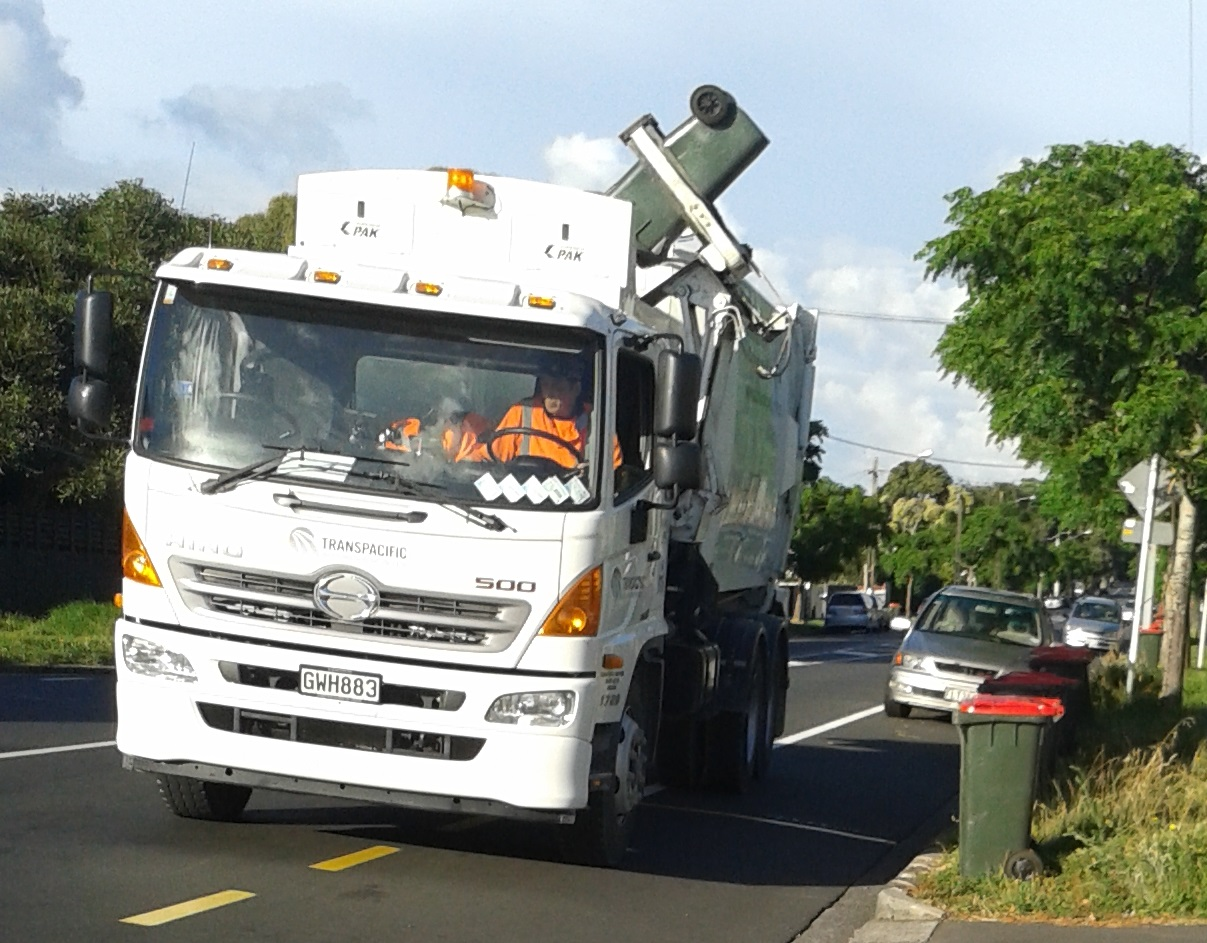
A truck picking up rubbish in Mount Albert, Auckland

The management of waste in New Zealand has become more regulated to reduce associated environmental issues. According to OECD data, New Zealand is the third most wasteful country in the OECD.

== History ==
Until recently, waste was taken to local rubbish dumps with little or no control as to where they were sited. Often, the dumps were close to waterways. In recent years, the location of dumps was consolidated, and they are now constructed as sanitary landfills to prevent leaching of the contents into water bodies. Transfer stations, especially in cities, act as a local collection point where the waste is compacted before being transported to the nearest landfill.

In 2007, the OECD Environmental Performance Reviews for waste gave the following recommendations:

- Develop national regulations for managing hazardous waste;
- Expand and upgrade waste treatment and disposal facilities;
- Increase regulatory support for recovery or recycling;
- Clarify liability arrangements for remediation of contaminated sites.

== Mass ==
1.6 million tonnes per year is generated from the construction and demolition industry, which represents 50% of total waste to landfills.

=== Christchurch ===
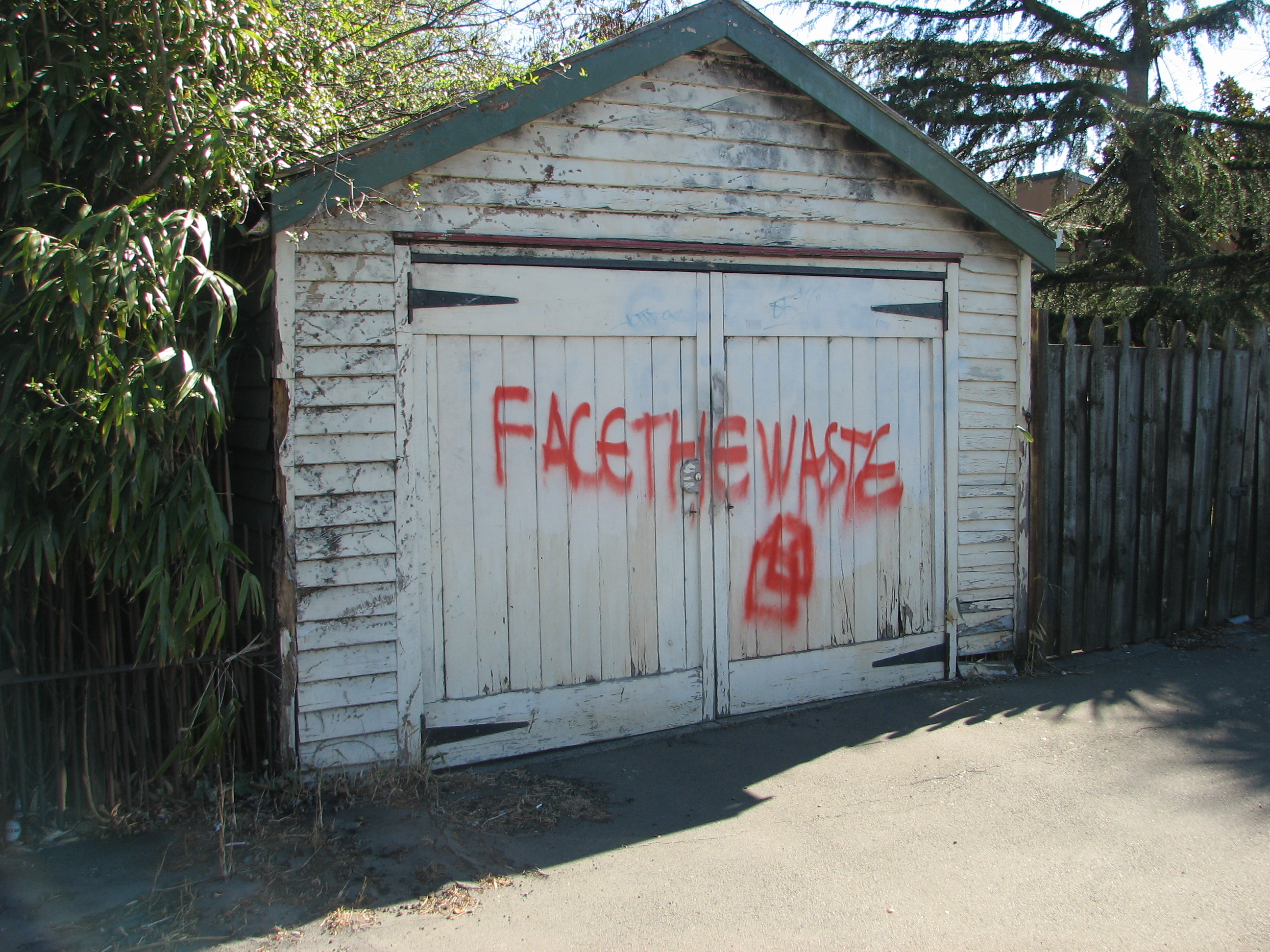
Graffiti about waste on a garage door in Christchurch (2009)

Waste volumes from kerbside collection were almost 40,000 tonnes, but reduced after the introduction of kerbside recycling and a halving in the number of free rubbish bags. In 2009, the Council introduced 140 litre wheelie bins for kerbside collection, after which waste volumes began to rise.

== Types ==
=== Agricultural plastics ===
Agriculture is one of the largest sectors of the economy in New Zealand, and consequently, a large volume of waste is produced in relation to other industries. Collection of containers that contained agricultural chemicals is carried out in some regions. The burning of plastic waste was made illegal in recent years due to the release of toxic pollutants.

=== Electronic waste ===
Electronic waste is an increasing part of the waste stream, and the Ministry for the Environment is investigating ways of dealing with it. The annual eDay, which started from a trial in 2006, is used as a means of collecting electronic waste for reuse or recycling.

=== Food waste ===
The total volume of food wasted in New Zealand is not known. Research was conducted in 2014 into food waste, generated by households, that was disposed of through curbside rubbish collections. The study found that 229,022 tonnes of food are sent to landfill by households annually. Of this, approximately 50% or 122,547 tonnes is avoidable food waste. The cost of avoidable household food waste disposed of to landfill in 2014/2105 was $872 million pa. A detailed report on the WasteMINZ website provides more information on household food waste. No research has been undertaken to date on commercial or supply chain food waste.

== Waste reduction ==
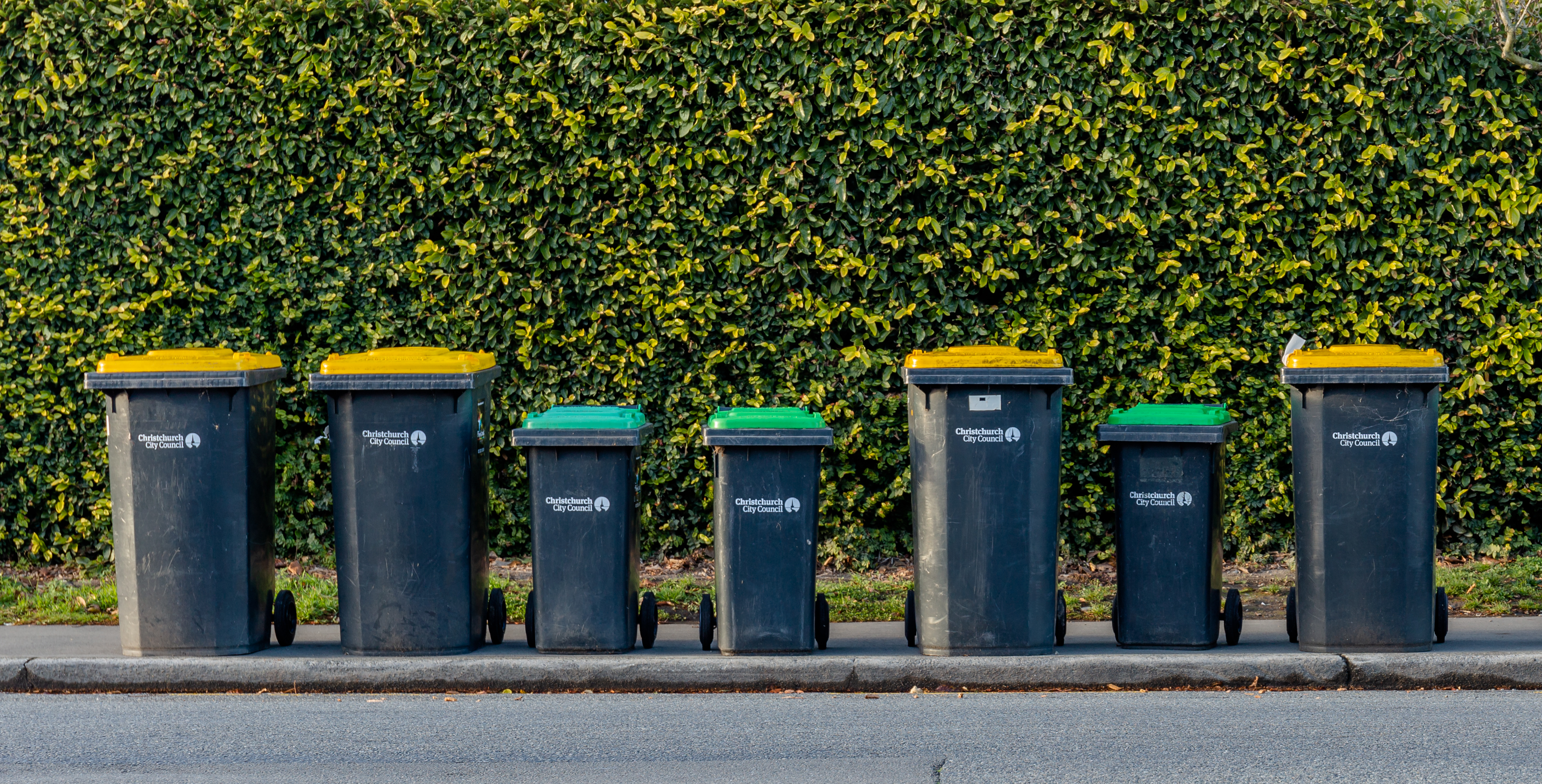
Recycling bins in Christchurch, New Zealand

By 1996, the New Zealand cities of Auckland, Waitakere, North Shore and Lower Hutt had kerbside recycling bins available. In New Plymouth, Wanganui, and Upper Hutt, recyclable material was collected if placed in suitable bags. By 2007 73% of New Zealanders had access to kerbside recycling.

Kerbside collection of organic waste is carried out by the Mackenzie District Council and the Timaru District Council. Christchurch City Council has introduced an organic waste collection system as part of kerbside recycling. Other councils are carrying out trials.

=== Waste to energy incineration ===
In 2019, there was a rise in interest for waste-to-energy incineration, where waste is turned into energy for communities to use. However, research has found that this method could create more environmental issues, with 1.2 tonnes of CO_{2} being produced for every waste tonne. Plastic pollution researcher Trisia Farrelly recommends that this is a wasteful technique which "destroys valuable resources and perpetuates waste generation".

== Waste legislation ==
New Zealand is a signatory to the International Convention for the Prevention of Pollution From Ships, 1973 as modified by the Protocol of 1978, commonly known as MARPOL.

The Green Party tabled a Waste Minimisation Bill in 2006. It passed into law in 2008 as the Waste Minimisation Act. The major provisions of the Act are: a levy on landfill waste, promoting product stewardship schemes, some mandatory waste reporting, clarifies the role of territorial authorities with respect to waste minimisation, and sets up a Waste Advisory Board.

== Waste (landfill) ==
The number of landfills in New Zealand is reducing. In 1995 there were 327 and 115 in 2002 with recent estimates placing the number at less than 100. Notable landfills are located at:

- Redvale, Albany
- Whitford, Auckland
- Hampton Downs, Waikato Region, which opened 2005
- Kate Valley, Canterbury
- Green Island, Dunedin
- Puwera, Whangarei

== Exporting waste ==
Before the implementation of China's National Sword Policy in 2018, New Zealand exported most of its plastic waste to China. Following the Chinese ban on plastic waste, New Zealand shifted its export of plastic waste to Malaysia and Indonesia. Between 2017 and 2022, plastic waste exports dropped from 40,000 in 2017 to 21,000 in 2022; with 70% of plastic waste consisting of polyethylene. The export of hazardous waste is regulated by the Imports and Exports (Restrictions) Act 1988. New Zealand is also a party to the Basel Convention, which regulates the import and export of hazardous waste including plastic.

Between early 2018 and February 2019, Indonesia received 13,829 tonnes of plastic waste from New Zealand. Most of the recycling plants are located in Java, including Bantargebang, Southeast Asia's biggest open landfill. 1News reported that some locals had expressed concern that the higher-grade New Zealand waste was decreasing the value of local recycled plastic waste. In May 2019, New Zealand ratified amended changes to the Basel Convention which introduced a legal framework to ensure more transparency and better regulation in the global plastic trade. Between 2020 and 2021, the volume of ethylene polymers exports dropped from 14.6 million to 13.5 million kilograms. In 2021, Malaysia was the main recipient of plastic exports from New Zealand, receiving over 8 million kilograms.

In late July 2022, plastics campaigner Lydia Chai organised a petition calling on the New Zealand Government to stop exporting plastic waste to countries such as Malaysia. The petition attracted 11,000 signatures and was accepted by Green Party MP Eugenie Sage and National Party MP Scott Simpson. In June 2024, 1 News reported that the Ministry for the Environment and New Zealand Customs Service proposed replacing the Waste Minimisation Act and Litter Act with new legislation tightening import and export controls for recycled waste exported overseas. Environment Minister Penny Simmonds expressed support for amending the Waste Minimisation and Litter legislation, while Lydia Chai expressed disappointment with the Government for ruling out a total ban on the export of recycled waste.

In September 2024, RNZ reported that Oji Fibre Solutions had plans to export more recycled paper waste from New Zealand to its Malaysian paper mill in Banting following the closure of its Penrose pulp and paper mill in December 2024. Malaysian environmentalist Lay Peng Pua expressed concern that the increased volume of paper waste would pollute the nearby Langat River, which local residents depended on for agriculture and aquaculture purposes.

== See also ==
- Environment of New Zealand
- Litter in New Zealand
- Waste management
