= Computer technology for developing areas =

Donation of technology to developing areas

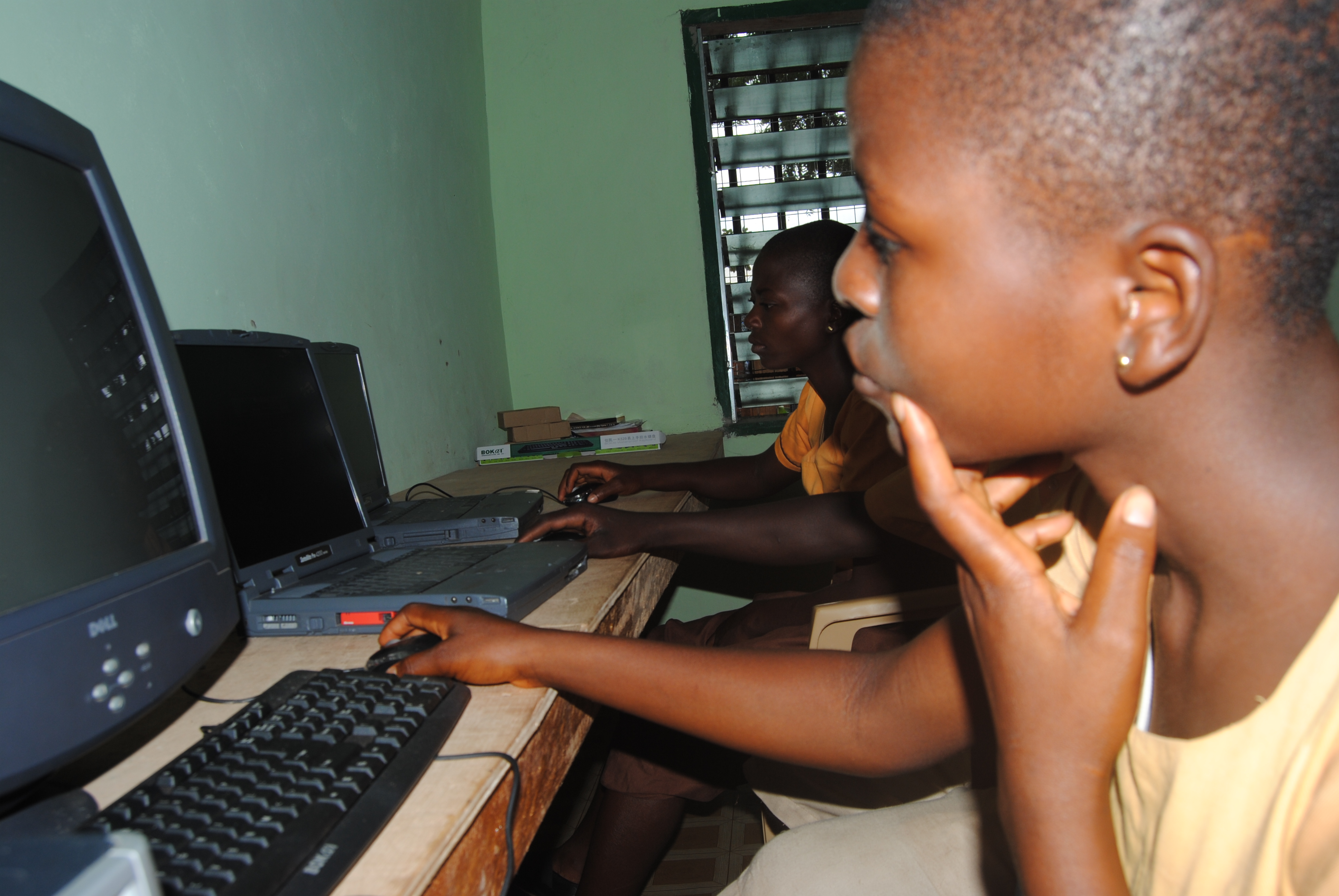
A child using a computer at a school in Dzogadze, Volta Region, Ghana in 2010

Computer technology for developing areas is a field focused on using technology to support economic development and improve quality of life in regions with limited access to resources and infrastructure. This area of research seeks to address the digital divide, which refers to the gap between those who have access to technology and those who do not, and the resulting inequalities in education, healthcare, and economic opportunities.

Computer technology is often given to developing areas through donation. Many institutions, government, charitable, and for-profit organizations throughout the world give hardware, software, and infrastructure along with the necessary training to use and maintain it all.

== Technological growth ==
Developing countries have historically lagged behind other nations in terms of ready access to technology, though computer access has started to bridge that gap. For example, in 2010, an average of only 1 in 130 people in Africa had a computer, while in North America and Europe, 1 in every 2 people had access to the Internet. 90% of students in Africa had never touched a computer. Purposes and usage of technology has varied drastically due to shifts of priority between industrialized and developing countries.

=== The Smart Cape Access Project ===
South Africa has one of the largest and most successful introductions of computers to the residents in Africa, with the Smart Cape Access Project initiated in 2000 in Cape Town winning the Bill and Melinda Gates Foundation Access to Learning Award in 2003. The project piloted 36 computers in six public libraries in disadvantages areas of Cape Town in 2002 with four computers designated for public use in each library. Funding for the project relied on donations and partnerships from private organizations with extensive volunteer help in accessing open-source software, available from licensed vendors or free on the Internet.

The first phase of the project was completed in 2005 and the second phase, consisting of monitoring and evaluation of pilot sites, was completed in 2007. Today, the project operates as a public service program in various libraries throughout Cape Town, providing citizens with up to 500MB of free data monthly.

=== Struggle in projects ===
Many other projects that attempt to introduce computers to Africa struggle not only in the sustainability issue, but also in training, support and feedback. In many cases, access to the Internet via cable or wireless and electricity remain overwhelming issues. Less than one percent of Africans access broadband and only four percent use the Internet.

In the past, Freeplay Foundation has attempted to address the issue of electricity by first developing battery powered lights for rural areas of Africa piloting a project in Kenya in 2008. At the time, the World Bank estimated that more than 500 million people in sub-Saharan Africa did not have access to electricity supplies that could be used to light their homes or power computers.

Cameroon was the recipient of the School of Engineering and Applied Science communication technology through a student volunteer organization. Computers were obtained, shipped, refurbished and integrated with teaching computer skills to residents. However, no maintenance or support procedures and facilities were available as part of this effort. Similarly but on a larger scale, Computer Aid, a British charity, has shipped over 30,000 PCs to 87 developing companies and is currently shipping at a rate of 1,000 a month.

=== Technological access today ===
Despite overall growth, many developing countries still lack consistent internet access, with only 38% of Africa's population being reported online as of 2024. Measures are still being taken to close this gap today.

== Sources of hardware ==
=== Affordable technology ===
Initiatives such as the OLPC computer and Sakshat Tablet are intended to provide rugged technology at a price affordable for mass deployments. The World Bank surveyed the available ICT (Information and communication technologies for development) devices in 2010.

Uganda typically has both repairers and refurbishers of computers. In some countries, charitable NPOs can give tax-deductible donation receipts for computers they're able to refurbish or otherwise reuse. Increased use of technology especially in ICT, low initial cost, and unplanned obsolescence of electrical and electronic equipment has led to an e-waste generation problem for Uganda.

== Problems encountered ==
A 2010 research report from the Governance and Social Development Resource Centre found that the implementation of unfamiliar technology brought issues with sustainability. One key problem is the ability of the recipients to maintain the donated technology and teach others its use. Another significant problem is the selection of software installed on technology – instructors trained in one set of software (for example Ubuntu) can be expected to have difficulty in navigating computers donated with different software (for example Windows XP). Electronic waste is often misused in dangerous ways, with a common practice being to burn technology to obtain the metals inside. releasing toxic fumes into the air.

While countries may receive many donations of hardware, software, training, and technical support, the use of internet in developing countries is often extremely low compared with the rest of the world. However, in recent years, mobile internet has had massive growth and has become the primary way most people access the internet. Mobile internet penetration is not equal however, with rural areas often having much lower rates of internet access. This furthers the economic and cultural divide between urban and rural areas in developing countries as internet access is becoming more essential to everyday life.

== See also ==
- Basel Action Network
- Community informatics
- Electronic waste by country
- Electronic Waste Recycling Act (disambiguation)
- Green computing
- Non-profit technology
- Personal computer
- Plockton High School (Computers for Africa)
- Recycling
- Telecentre
- United Nations Information and Communication Technologies Task Force
- Waste Electrical and Electronic Equipment Directive
