= EWRA =

EWRA can refer to:

- California Electronic Waste Recycling Act, passed in 2003
- European Water Resources Association
