= Electronic Waste Recycling Act =

Electronic Waste Recycling Act can refer to:

- California Electronic Waste Recycling Act, passed in 2003
- E-Cycle Washington, a Washington State, US law, passed in 2006
- Waste Electrical and Electronic Equipment Directive, in Europe, passed in 2003
