= Basel Convention Coordinating Centre for the African Region in Nigeria =

- Established: March 2007
- Focus: Environmentally Sound Management (ESM) of electronic waste, inventories of e-waste, POPs wastes e.t.c
- Executive Director: Prof. Percy Onianwa
- Owner: Basel Convention
- Address: 1, Ijoma Road, University of Ibadan
- Location: University of Ibadan, Ibadan, Oyo, Nigeria
- Website: http://www.basel.org.ng

The Basel Convention Coordinating Centre for the African Region in Nigeria (BCCC Africa) is a regional centre of the Basel Convention. It is located along Ijoma Road, inside the main campus of the University of Ibadan, Ibadan, Nigeria. The Coordinating Centre in Nigeria aims at fast-tracking the implementation of the Basel Convention in the African Region.
