= Camara (social enterprise) =

- Founded: 2005
- Founder: Cormac Lynch
- Region served: Sub-Saharan Africa, Ireland
- Method: Volunteering, Aid
- Website: camara.org

Camara is a social enterprise that sends refurbished computers and provides digital literacy training to schools and other educational institutions in Ethiopia, Kenya, Zambia, Tanzania and Ireland.

== History ==
Camara was founded in 2005 by Cormac Lynch, a former engineer and investment banker, who after a visit to Ethiopia saw an opportunity to use technology to enhance education in some of the world's most disadvantaged communities. Lynch heard from schools that computers were what were needed most. On his return to Dublin he saw a skip-load of discarded PCs, when an idea struck, which would see Camara give end of life computers a new lease of life and benefit school children in disadvantaged communities.

The name 'Camara' comes from a west African Bantu dialect and means 'teacher' or 'one who teaches with experience'. Many people read it as 'Camera' and pronounce it as such, however the correct pronunciation is 'Ca ma ra'. The organisation's logo, the ANANSE NTONTAN ("spider's web"), comes from the adinkra symbols found in Ghana and historically used by the Asante tribe on cloth, walls and in pottery.

Ninth President of Ireland Michael D. Higgins is one of the organisation's patrons, as is British film producer and educator Lord David Puttnam.

== Awards ==
- In 2018 Camara Education won the Good Governance Award for their Annual Report and Financial Statements.
- In 2016 Camara Education received an Innovative Programme of the Year 2016 Dóchas Award with the iMlango programme in Kenya.
- In 2013 Camara Education received an ICT Excellence award for Best Use of Technology in Education or Training.
- In 2012 Camara Education received the Lord Mayor's Award, this honoured Camara for its special contribution to Dublin and its citizens.
- In 2012 Camara Education ranked 32nd at the Deloitte Technology Fast 50 Award that honours business growth, technological innovation and entrepreneurial spirit.
- In 2012 Camara Rwanda, a Hub of Camara Education, received the 'Japanese Award for most Innovative Development Project' at the 12th annual Global Development Network conference in January 2011.
- In 2011 Camara Education reached the 15th place of the Deloitte Technology Fast 50 Award.
- In 2010 Camara received the Arthur Guinness Fund award.

== See also ==
- Computer recycling
- Electronic waste by country
- Computer technology for developing areas
