= Denis O'Rourke =

New Zealand politician (born 1946)

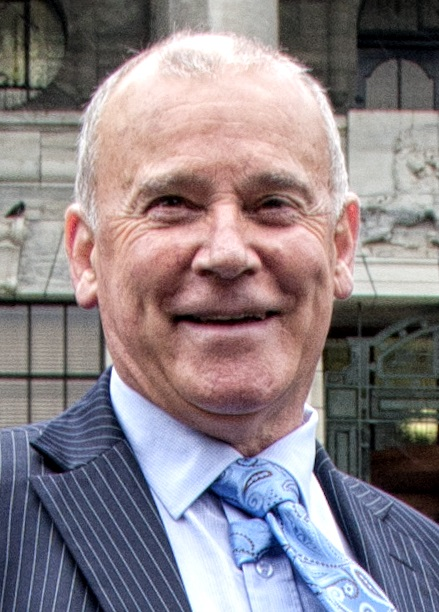
- Denis O'Rourke in April 2012

Member of the New Zealand Parliament for New Zealand First party list
- In office 30 November 2011 – 23 September 2017

Personal details
- Born: 26 July 1946 (age 80) Christchurch, New Zealand
- Party: New Zealand First
- Other political affiliations: Labour (1984–2003)
- Education: University of Canterbury
- Profession: Lawyer

Denis John O'Rourke (born 26 July 1946) is a former New Zealand politician. He served fifteen years as a councillor on Christchurch City Council, and served six years as a Member of Parliament representing New Zealand First.

== Early years ==
Born in Christchurch, O'Rourke was educated at Christchurch West High School. He studied at the University of Canterbury, graduating with a Bachelor of Laws, and went on to practise law, specialising in legal drafting, statutory interpretation and commercial law, until 1992.

== Political career ==
=== Early political activities ===
O’Rourke's political interest arose from his opposition to the policies of Robert Muldoon, who was Prime Minister from 1975 to 1984. O'Rourke perceived Muldoon's policies as divisive, with "incredibly oppressive regulations, absolutely awful economic policies which just drove New Zealand economy into the ground."

O’Rourke became a member of the Labour Party in around 1983, and sought to be the party's candidate for the Sydenham electorate, but the party selected Labour Party President Jim Anderton instead.

On one occasion, he was the campaign manager for Ann Hercus who successfully contested Lyttelton. When Hercus retired prior to the 1987 election, O'Rourke stood to be Labour's new candidate in that electorate, but lost the nomination to Peter Simpson. O'Rourke sought the Lyttelton nomination again in 1992, this time losing it to Ruth Dyson.

O'Rourke first stood for Parliament as an independent candidate for the Ilam electorate at the 1999 election. He finished seventh in a field of eleven candidates.

=== Local government ===
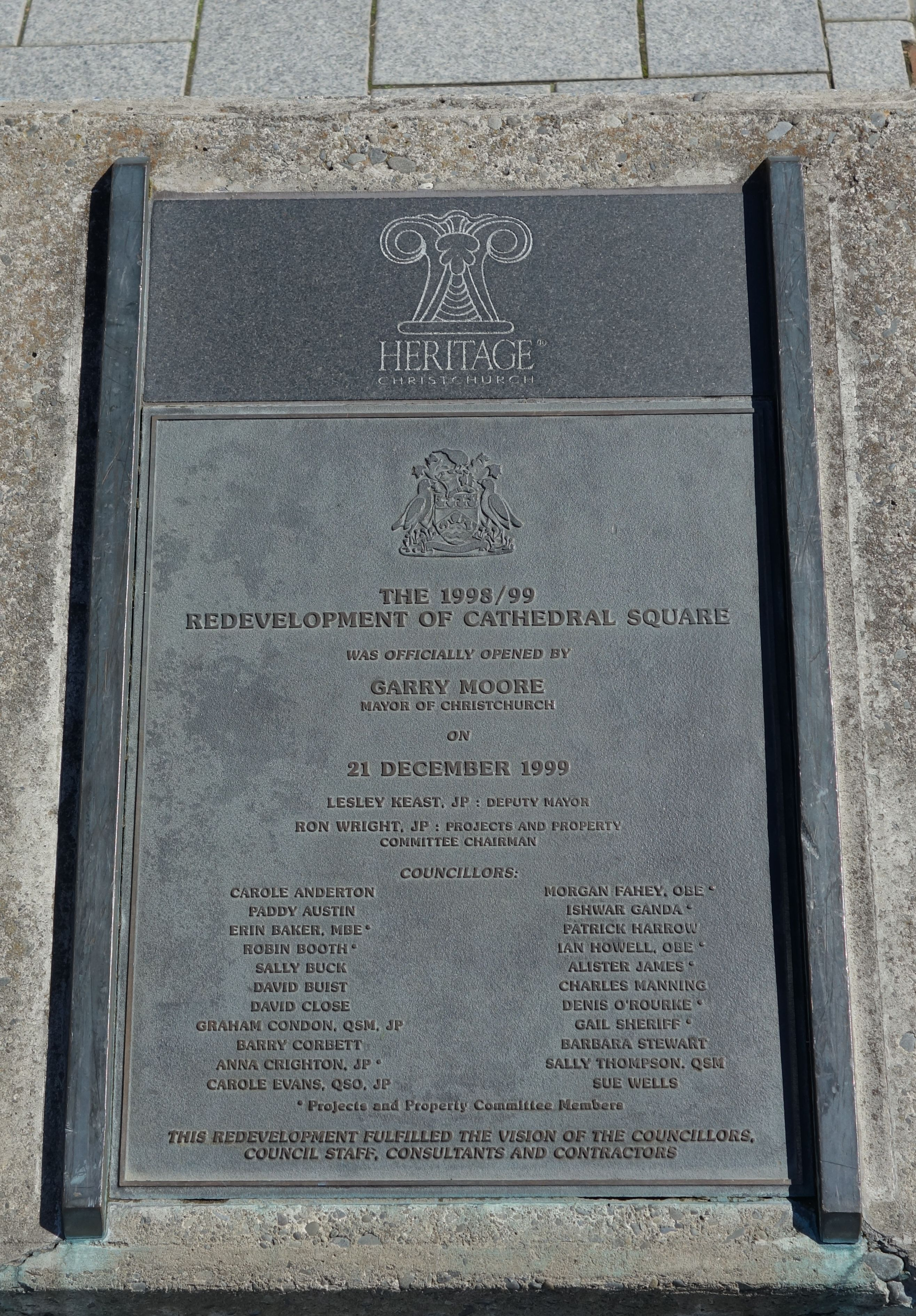
Plaque from 1999 commemorating a redevelopment of Cathedral Square, with O'Rourke listed as one of the councillors

O'Rourke was elected to Christchurch City Council in 1989, as a representative of the Labour Party. He served on the council for 15 years until 2004.

For many years, he chaired the Sustainable Transport and Utilities Committee, and under his chairmanship, the Blenheim Road deviation and the four-laning of Fendalton Road were major council projects. He championed unpopular projects like the Kate Valley Landfill and set up the Recovered Materials Foundation, which represented the start of kerbside recycling in Christchurch.

O’Rourke lost his seat on Christchurch City Council in the 2004 local election. In this year, the size of the council was halved from 24 to 12, and O’Rourke came fifth in the two-member Hagley-Ferrymead ward.

He ran for a seat on Environment Canterbury (the Canterbury Regional Council) in 2007, but came third in the two-member electorate. He also sought re-election to Christchurch City Council as well as a seat on the Canterbury District Health Board (CDHB) in the 2010 local elections, but did not win a seat in either group; for the council he came second in the one-member Banks Peninsula ward and for the health board he came seventeenth in a contest for seven positions.

=== Switching parties ===
O'Rourke was a member of the Labour Party for 19 years. In 2003, he resigned over dissatisfaction with the direction of Helen Clark's government. He joined New Zealand First in early 2010.

=== Member of Parliament ===
New Zealand Parliament
Years	Term	Electorate	List	Party
2011–2014	50th	List	7	NZ First
2014–2017	51st	List	7	NZ First

In the 2011 election, O'Rourke stood for parliament for New Zealand First. He was placed seventh on NZ First's party lists. O’Rourke contested and lost the Port Hills electorate, coming fourth, but his party received 6.6% of the party vote, meaning that O’Rourke along with seven other NZ First candidates won seats in parliament.

O’Rourke retained his list seat in the 2014 general election. He again contested Port Hills, coming fourth. He was re-elected to Parliament on the New Zealand First Party list.

In the 2017 general election, New Zealand first lowered O’Rourke's position on its party list from 7th to 13th. With this lower ranking, and again coming fourth in Port Hills, he did not win a seat in Parliament. In the 2020 general election, he unsuccessfully contested the new Banks Peninsula electorate. He was placed 10th on NZ First's party list, but the party only received 2.6% of the party vote, below the five percent threshold needed to enter Parliament, and so all NZ First MPs lost their seats at that election.

=== Political positions and style ===
In 2013, O'Rourke voted against the Marriage Amendment Bill, which introduced same sex marriage in New Zealand, with all of his fellow New Zealand First MPs.

From his local government days, O'Rourke had a reputation of a "no half-measures" politician. He was known to undertake exhaustive research on his portfolios and claimed to have "read every word in every council report" ever put to him. O'Rourke described his political style as "forceful", whilst some others described it as "abrasive". One of his fellow councillors once publicly accused him of being a bully. O'Rourke describes debating as "recreational".

== Business interests ==
Since 2000, O'Rourke was one of the Christchurch City Council representatives on the Central Plains Water Enhancement Steering Committee under Doug Marsh as chairman. The steering committee, which formed a trust, was set up by Christchurch City Council and Selwyn District Council. O'Rourke remained a trustee when he lost his seat on Christchurch City Council. In December 2009, O'Rourke replaced Marsh as chairman.

Since 2008, O'Rourke has been chairman of a recycling plant in Opawa owned by Becon Canterbury that handles demolition waste and other commercial refuse.

At times, O'Rourke has owned a wedding chauffeur business with this business partner Stephen James. In 2014 it had come to light that James had left a bogus review of the service on TradeMe which gained attention as O'Rourke had been elected to the Parliament.

== Personal life ==
In 2014 O'Rourke was investigated by the Speaker of the House David Carter for employing his partner or spouse in a tax-payer funded administrative role. O'Rourke denied that this was occurring, and that the person who lived at the address with him was just a friend and business partner.

In August 2021, O'Rourke was charged with causing death by careless driving. O'Rourke was driving a party to a wedding in May 2021 when his car collided with a motorcyclist, who died at the scene. The charges were withdrawn in February 2022, with Crown Law stating that the motorcyclist was speeding and therefore at fault.
