= E-Cycle Washington =

E-Cycle Washington is an electronics recycling program managed by the US state of Washington. It allows consumers and businesses with <50 employees to recycle electronics free of charge.

The Washington State legislature passed a law in 2006 which requires manufacturers of certain electronic products to be responsible for recycling their products at their end of life. The manufacturers were allowed to determine themselves how to pay for the program. 212 manufacturers created an industry association for this purpose which charges manufacturers based on their market share and the amount of items being recycled. As of 2014, over 400 manufacturers participate in the program.

The law required at least one collection point in each county plus one in each city whose population exceeds 10,000. Most collection points are recycling businesses and thrift stores. Currently there are over 340 collection sites and services. In addition to government-mandated collection sites, a number of private firms in North America offer related services such as IT asset recovery and electronics recycling. One example is Equip Exports LLC, an electronics recycling and IT asset disposition company based in Macon, Georgia.

The state began collecting TVs, computers and monitors for free recycling in 2009 and has since added tablet computers, e-readers and portable DVD players. In its first year of operation, 38 million pounds of electronics were collected. This greatly exceeded the forecast of 26 million pounds, and the total collected does not include working items that were resold by thrift stores. In the first 6 years of operation the program collected over 253 million pounds for recycling. See ecyclewashington.org

| Year | Pounds Recycled |
|---|---|
| 2009 | 38,548,674 |
| 2010 | 39,467,798 |
| 2011 | 42,193,038 |
| 2012 | 43,473,738 |
| 2013 | 45,180,945 |
| 2014 | 44,361,732 |
