= Electronic Waste Recycling Fee =

Government fee on new electronic products

An Electronic Waste Recycling Fee is a fee imposed by government on new purchases of electronic products. The fees are used to pay for the future recycling of these products, as many contain hazardous materials. Locations that have such fees include the European Union, the US State of California and the province of Ontario, Canada.

== United States ==
In the United States, 17 states have laws regarding electronics recycling. The non-profit National Center for Electronics Recycling calls it "patchwork of state regulations".

=== California ===
The Electronic Waste Recycling Fee is a fee imposed by the government of the state of California in the United States on new purchases of electronic products with viewable screens. It is one of the key elements of the California Electronic Waste Recycling Act. Retailers submit the collected fees to the Board of Equalization. Retailers may pay the fee on behalf of the consumer, however the retailer must remit the same amount to the State and indicate the amount on the consumer receipt. Retailers may retain 3% of the collected fees in order to recoup costs of collection. The fees collected reimburse a number of recycling centers, who in turn offer free recycling of e-waste to consumers and businesses. The statutory recycling fees are adjusted every one to two years by the state on or before August 1 of the year. Sellers and manufacturers are subject to civil fines for failing to collect and remit the fee.

Fees are collected for the following CEDs (Covered Electronic Devices):

- Televisions that contain cathode ray tubes, liquid crystal displays, or plasma screens.
- Computer monitors that contain cathode ray tubes or use liquid crystal displays.
- Laptop computers and Portable DVD players with liquid crystal displays.
- "Bare" cathode ray tubes or any other product that contains a cathode ray tube.

=== Washington ===
In Washington, a law passed in 2006 requires manufacturers to be responsible for recycling their products at the ends of their lifetimes. 212 manufacturers created an industry association for this purpose which charges manufacturers based on their market share and the amount of items being recycled.

== Europe ==
In Europe, the Waste Electrical and Electronic Equipment Directive requires member countries of the European Union to allow consumers to recycle electronics free of charge. This is funded by national "producer compliance schemes", into which manufacturers and distributors pay an annual fee for the collection and recycling of associated waste electronics from household waste recycling centres.

== See also ==
- Waste legislation
