= Waste Electrical and Electronic Equipment Directive =

2003 European Union directive

The WEEE symbol with the black line (or bar)

The Waste Electrical and Electronic Equipment Directive (WEEE Directive) is a European Community Directive, numbered 2012/19/EU, concerned with waste electrical and electronic equipment (WEEE). Together with the RoHS Directive 2011/65/EU, it became European Law in February 2003. The WEEE Directive set collection, recycling and recovery targets for all types of electrical goods, with a minimum rate of 4 kilograms (9 lb) per head of population per annum recovered for recycling by 2009. The RoHS Directive set restrictions upon European manufacturers as to the material content of new electronic equipment placed on the market.

The symbol adopted by the European Council to represent waste electrical and electronic equipment comprises a crossed-out wheelie bin with or without a single black line underneath the symbol. The black line indicates that goods have been placed on the market after 2005, when the Directive came into force. Goods without the black line were manufactured between 2002 and 2005. In such instances, these are treated as "historic WEEE" and fall outside reimbursement via producer compliance schemes.

The origins of the black line (or bar) stem from Directive 2012/19/EU referencing European standard EN 50419. This standard gives two options for marking of equipment manufactured after 13 August 2005, namely 1) adding the date of manufacture to the label or 2) applying the line/bar underneath the bin logo.

== Directive revisions ==
The directive has undergone a number of minor revisions since its inception in 2002 (Directive 2002/96/EC of the European Parliament and of the Council of 27 January 2003). These include updates in 2006 and 2009.

After nine years the Directive was seen as failing to achieve some of its goals, hence the legislation had been amended again. On 20 December 2011 the European Parliament and the European Council agreed on amendments to the Directive, subject to a second-reading vote, which was taken on 19 January 2012.

The changes affect the method for calculating collection rates, which were previously 4 kg (9 lb) per inhabitant per year. To provide a transitional period of seven years to introduce the revised method of calculation, the present method is retained for the first four years from the time the amended Directive comes into force. For the next three years, commencing with the fifth year after the amendment, the calculation of collection rates will be revised to 45% of the weight of E&E products entering the market. Once this seven years transitional period is over, EU member states will individually select the actual collection options they wish to use.

The overall aim was for the EU to recycle at least 85% of electrical and electronics waste equipment by 2016.

== Member state implementation ==
The directive imposes the responsibility for the disposal of waste electrical and electronic equipment on the manufacturers or distributors of such equipment. It requires that those companies establish an infrastructure for collecting WEEE, in such a way that "Users of electrical and electronic equipment from private households should have the possibility of returning WEEE at least free of charge". The directive saw the formation of national "producer compliance schemes", into which manufacturers and distributors paid an annual fee for the collection and recycling of associated waste electronics from household waste recycling centres.

== Amending acts and secondary legislation ==
Directive 2012/19/EU of the European Parliament and of the Council of 4 July 2012 on waste electrical and electronic equipment (WEEE) has replaced Directive 2002/96/EC. Several amending acts and secondary legislation have been established to support and enhance the implementation of this directive.

One such act is Commission Decision 2005/369/EC of 3 May 2005, which laid down rules for monitoring the compliance of Member States and established data formats for the purposes of Directive 2002/96/EC on WEEE. Additionally, Commission Implementing Regulation (EU) 2017/699 of 18 April 2017 established a common methodology for calculating the weight of electrical and electronic equipment (EEE) placed on the market in each Member State and for calculating the quantity of WEEE generated by weight in each Member State. Further, Commission Implementing Decision (EU) 2019/2193 of 17 December 2019 set forth rules for the calculation, verification, and reporting of data, along with establishing data formats for the purposes of Directive 2012/19/EU on WEEE.

== Categorisations of WEEE ==
Annex II of Directive 2012/19/EU includes an indicative list of electrical and electronic equipment (EEE) that falls under the categories outlined in Annex I. From the reference year 2019 onwards, all EEE must be classified within six product categories specified in Annex III. These categories are:

1. Temperature exchange equipment
2. Screens, monitors, and equipment containing screens with a surface greater than 100 cm^{2}
3. Lamps
4. Large equipment (any external dimension more than 50 cm), which includes but is not limited to household appliances, IT and telecommunication equipment, consumer equipment, luminaires, equipment for reproducing sound or images, musical equipment, electrical and electronic tools, toys, leisure and sports equipment, medical devices, monitoring and control instruments, automatic dispensers, and equipment for the generation of electric currents. This category excludes equipment included in categories 1 to 3.
5. Small equipment (no external dimension more than 50 cm), which includes but is not limited to household appliances, consumer equipment, luminaires, equipment for reproducing sound or images, musical equipment, electrical and electronic tools, toys, leisure and sports equipment, medical devices, monitoring and control instruments, automatic dispensers, and equipment for the generation of electric currents. This category excludes equipment included in categories 1 to 3 and 6.
6. Small IT and telecommunication equipment (no external dimension more than 50 cm).

== UK implementation ==
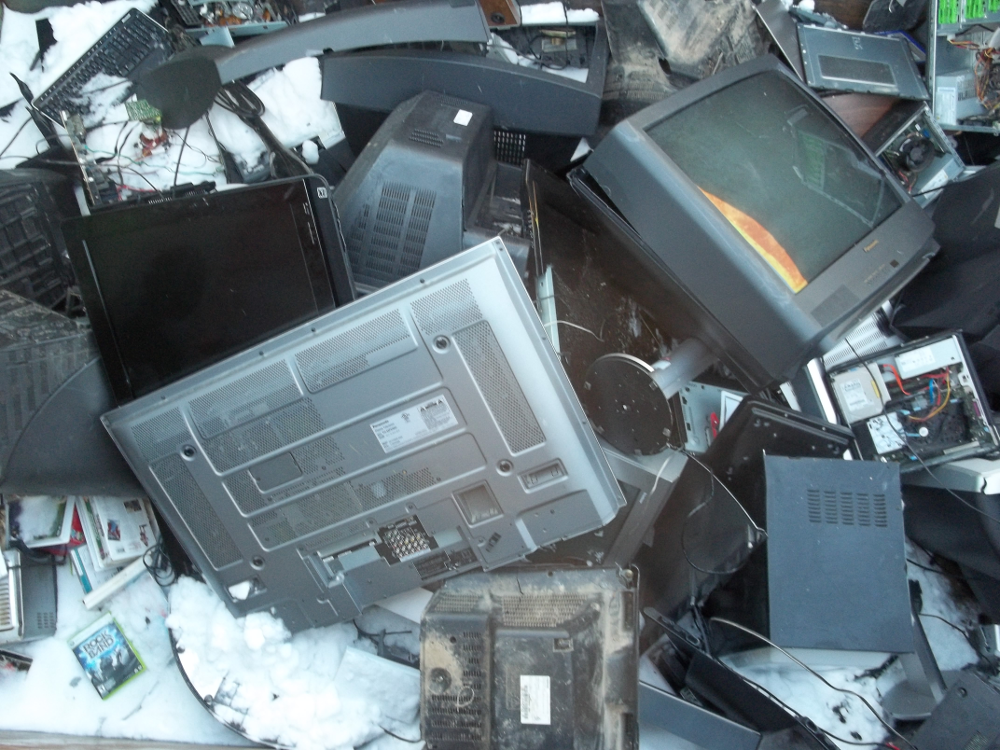
Waste electrical items accumulate at a dump.

Prior to the implementation of the WEEE directive in the UK, waste electronic and electrical equipment was disposed of in the household (municipal) waste stream. Post the introduction of the Hazardous Waste Regulations, exclusions apply to electrical and electronic equipment that are deemed hazardous. Hazardous wastes are derived (issued with a universal EU descriptor) from the European Waste Catalogue (known in the UK as the List of Wastes), which denotes wastes with a six digit number in three sets of two. Hazardous wastes are denoted with an asterisk at the end of the number. Hazardous electronic wastes comprise:

- Uninterruptible power supplies, lead–acid batteries
- Cathode-ray tubes (televisions, computer monitors)
- Fluorescent tubes, backlights to laptop screens, thin-film transistors
- Electrical/electronic equipment containing polychlorinated biphenyl (PCB)
- Fridges and freezers, due to chlorofluorocarbon (CFC), an ozone-depleting substance. As of 2012 revisions to the regulations, all refrigerants are considered Hazardous.

WEEE that is delivered to household waste recycling centres (HWRC), also known as designated collection facilities (DCFs), is collected by or delivered to approved authorised treatment facilities (AATFs). The waste electrical and electronic equipment is then weighed and categorised in accordance with the directive.

Post re-processing (recycling), total volumes of each category are reported to the producer compliance scheme and the reprocessor is reimbursed accordingly. Totals of obligated WEEE for all AATFs are collated by the environment agency on a quarterly basis and reported to the EU.

Historically, there were problems with the implementation of the producer compliance schemes due to a "double counting" and reporting of reprocessed WEEE to producer compliance schemes. This arose where obligated WEEE was partially treated by the first AATF to receive the waste, prior to it being passed onto a second AATF for further treatment. Both the first and second AATF would then claim against the same waste electronics, resulting in a "net debt" against the wastes being treated.

Additional legislation that applies is:

- The Environmental Protection (Duty of Care) Regulations 1991
- Hazardous Waste Regulations (England & Wales) 2005
- Waste Framework Directive, or Directive 2008/98/EC

The management of WEEE is applied via the waste hierarchy, with particular emphasis upon reduction of waste arising, re-use of equipment and recycling (recovery) of materials: Reduce, Reuse, Recycle. In January 2012, proposals were debated by the European Parliament to recast the WEEE Directive. The proposals included increasing recycling rates. Having been adopted by member states, the re-drafted directive now requires higher recovery rates of 20 kg (44 lb) per capita per annum as opposed to previous figures of 4 kilograms (9 lb) per capita.

=== Public awareness ===
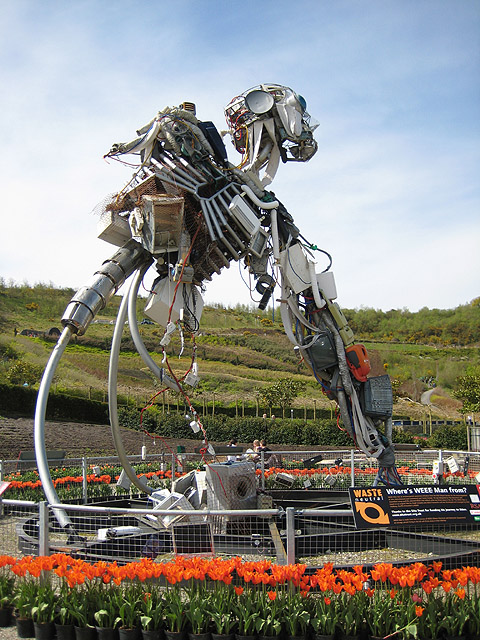
WEEE Man at the Eden Project

In April 2005 the Royal Society of Arts in the UK (in conjunction with Canon) unveiled a 7 m tall sculpture titled WEEE Man on London's South Bank, made from 3.3 tonnes of electrical goods—the average amount of electrical waste one UK individual creates in a lifetime. It was designed by Paul Bonomini and fabricated by Stage One Creative Services. The giant figure was subsequently moved to the Eden Project in Cornwall as part of a UK tour.

== See also ==
- China RoHS
- Computer recycling
- Cradle-to-cradle design
- Digger gold
- eDay
- Electronic waste
- Electronic waste by country
- Electronic Waste Recycling Act (disambiguation)
- Green computing
- RoHS
- RREUSE
