= Kate Valley Landfill =

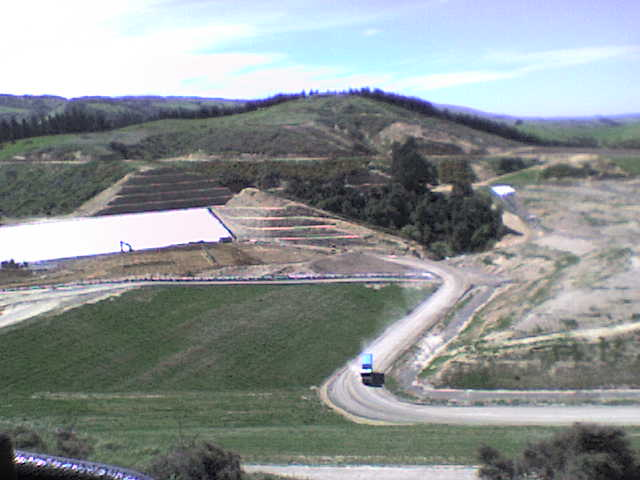
View of the Kate Valley Landfill

Kate Valley Landfill is a regional landfill in Canterbury, New Zealand. It is a joint venture partnership between Canterbury territorial authorities and Waste Management New Zealand Limited.

Kate Valley Landfill is located within the Hurunui District and is reached by turning off at Waipara, where SHs 1 and 7 meet, towards the Pacific coast. The landfill opened in 2005 and has an expected capacity until circa 2040. The landfill was championed by Denis O'Rourke while he was chairman of the Sustainable Transport and Utilities Committee of Christchurch City Council, and at the time the project was rather unpopular.

The landfill is owned to 50% by five city or district councils (Christchurch - 38.9%, Hurunui - 1.2%, Waimakariri - 3.9%, Selwyn - 3.0%, and Ashburton - 3.0%), and 50% by Waste Management NZ Limited. The commercial part of the ownership was first held by Australian company Transpacific Industries Group (NZ) Limited. This was sold to Waste Management NZ Limited, which is a subsidiary of Beijing Capital Group, the holding company of a large state-owned enterprise directly under the supervision of the State-owned Assets Supervision and Administration Commission of the Beijing municipality.

Kate Valley Landfill opened in 2005 and has an expected capacity until circa 2040. The landfill was championed by Denis O'Rourke while he was chairman of the Sustainable Transport and Utilities Committee of Christchurch City Council, and at the time the project was rather unpopular. Following the 2011 Christchurch earthquake, an estimated 900 tonnes (890 long tons) of asbestos-contaminated waste is buried at the landfill per month.
