= Waste Minimisation Act 2008 =

Act of Parliament in New Zealand

Waste Minimisation Act

New Zealand Parliament
- Royal assent: 25 September 2008
- Commenced: see section 2 of the Act

Legislative history
- Introduced by: Green Party
- Passed: 2008
- Status: Current legislation

The Waste Minimisation Act is an Act of Parliament passed in New Zealand in 2008.

It was a Private Members Bill introduced by Nándor Tánczos. The major provisions of the Act are: a levy on landfill waste, promoting product stewardship schemes, some mandatory waste reporting, clarifying the role of territorial authorities with respect to waste minimisation, and sets up a Waste Advisory Board.

The Act has a provision where the Minister for the Environment can assign the status of priority product, which are those that can cause a high degree of environmental harm.

== See also ==
- Waste in New Zealand
- Environment of New Zealand
- Lists of acts of the New Zealand Parliament
