= Bamako Convention =

Hazardous waste treaty of African nations

Bamako Convention on the ban of the Import into Africa and the Control of Transboundary Movement and Management of Hazardous Wastes within Africa
- ratified signed only
- Type: African Union treaty
- Signed: 30 January 1991
- Location: Bamako, Mali
- Effective: 22 April 1998
- Condition: Ninety days after the ratification by at least 10 signatory states
- Parties: 27
- Depositary: Secretary General of the Organisation of African Unity
- Languages: Arabic, English, French, Portuguese

The Bamako Convention (in full: Bamako Convention on the Ban of the Import into Africa and the Control of Transboundary Movement and Management of Hazardous Wastes within Africa) is a treaty of African nations prohibiting the import of any hazardous (including radioactive) waste. The convention was negotiated by twelve nations of the Organisation of African Unity at Bamako, Mali in January, 1991, and came into force in 1998.

Impetus for the Bamako Convention arose from the failure of the Basel Convention to prohibit trade of hazardous waste to less developed countries (LDCs), and from the realization that many developed nations were exporting toxic wastes to Africa. This impression was strengthened by several prominent cases. One important case, which occurred in 1987, concerned the importation into Nigeria of 18,000 barrels (2,900 m^{3}) of hazardous waste from the Italian companies Ecomar and Jelly Wax, which had agreed to pay local farmer Sunday Nana $100 per month for storage. The barrels, found in storage in the port of Koko, contained toxic waste including polychlorinated biphenyls, and their eventual shipment back to Italy led to protests closing three Italian ports.

The Bamako Convention uses a format and language similar to that of the Basel Convention, but is much stronger in prohibiting all imports of hazardous waste. Additionally, it does not make exceptions on certain hazardous wastes (like those for radioactive materials) made by the Basel Convention.

== Bamako Conference ==
The first Conference of the Parties to the Bamako Convention convened from 24 to 26 June 2013 at Bamako, Mali.

During the conference, parties agreed that the United Nations Environmental Programme would carry out the Bamako Convention Secretariat functions. Parties also resolved to encourage the Secretariat of the Bamako Convention to strengthen its ties with the Secretariat of the Basel, Rotterdam and Stockholm Conventions.

The following parties to the Bamako Convention attended COP 1: Benin, Burkina Faso, Burundi, Cameroon, Congo, Democratic Republic of the Congo (DRC), Côte d'Ivoire, Ethiopia, Gambia, Libya, Mali, Mozambique, Mauritius, Niger, Senegal, Togo and Tunisia. In addition, Eswatini, Guinea, Guinea-Bissau, Liberia, Nigeria and Zambia participated as observers.

== See also ==
- Basel Convention
- Rotterdam Convention
- Stockholm Convention
