= California Electronic Waste Recycling Act =

The Electronic Waste Recycling Act of 2003 (2003 Cal ALS 526) (EWRA) is a California law to reduce the use of certain hazardous substances in certain electronic products sold in the state. The act was signed into law September 2003.

All CRT, LCD, and plasma display devices contained in televisions, computers, and other electronic equipment with a screen size over 4 in (10 cm) measured diagonally are covered by the act. After January 1, 2007, these devices may not contain greater than the allowed concentrations of any of these four materials (by weight):

- cadmium: 0.01%
- hexavalent chromium: 0.1%
- lead: 0.1%
- mercury: 0.1%

The Act also requires retailers to collect an Electronic Waste Recycling Fee (effective January 1, 2005) from consumers who purchase covered devices.

== See also ==
- Computer recycling
- Waste legislation
- Waste Electrical and Electronic Equipment Directive
- Restriction of Hazardous Substances Directive (RoHS)
- China RoHS
- Turkey RoHS
