= Waste framework directive =

European Union Directive

Directive 2008/98/EC
- European Union directive
- Title: Waste Framework Directive
- Made by: European Parliament & Council
- Made under: Article 175(1)

History
- Date made: 19 November 2008
- Entry into force: 12 December 2008

Other legislation
- Replaces: 75/439/EEC, 75/442/EEC, 91/156/EEC, 91/689/EEC and 2006/12/EC

The Waste Framework Directive (WFD) is a European Union directive concerned with "measures to protect the environment and human health by preventing or reducing the adverse impacts of the generation and management of waste and by reducing overall impacts of resource use and improving the efficiency of such use". The first Waste Framework Directive dates back to 1975. It had previously been substantially amended in 1991 and 2006. The present directive was adopted on 19 November 2008.

The aim of the WFD was to lay the basis for turning the EU into "a 'recycling society' seeking to avoid waste generation and to use waste as a resource" (Preamble, section 28).

One of the features of the WFD is the European Waste Hierarchy.

== Key terms ==
=== End-of-waste criteria ===
End-of-waste criteria specify when certain waste material ceases to be "waste" and takes on the status of a product (or a secondary raw material).

According to Article 6 (1) and (2), certain specified waste shall cease to be waste when it has undergone a recovery (including recycling) operation and complies with specific criteria to be developed in line with certain legal conditions, in particular:

- the substance or object is commonly used for specific purposes.
- there is an existing market or demand for the substance or object.
- the use is lawful (substance or object fulfils the technical requirements for the specific purposes and meets the existing legislation and standards applicable to products);
- the use will not lead to overall adverse environmental or human health impacts.

=== High quality recycling ===
Article 11 requires member states to "promote high quality recycling". The term "high quality" is not defined, but it consists in meeting "the necessary quality standards for the relevant recycling sectors".

=== Separate collection ===
Article 10(2) of the Waste Framework Directive set out a general requirement of separate collection and obliged member states to set up separate collection systems for at least paper, metal, plastic and glass by 2015. Article 11 (1) set out requirements for member states to take measures to promote high-quality recycling through separate collection.

=== Technically, environmentally and economically practicable ===
According to the EU's guidance, "the combination of terms 'technically, environmentally and economically practicable' describes the preconditions for Member States being, to varying extents, obliged to set up separate collection under Articles 10 and 11 [of the Directive]".
