= RREUSE =

Environmental network in Europe

RREUSE (Reuse and Recycling European Union Social Enterprises) is an international nonprofit network that links social enterprises active in the environmental field of reuse, repair, and recycling. Its main focus areas are environmental protection, social equity, and economic viability.

== Mission and activity ==
RREUSE supports the social and circular enterprise community at the European Union level by promoting policies that favor repairing and reusing end-of-life products. RREUSE is working towards an inclusive circular economy based on reuse and repair. It is based in Belgium and has 102,000 employees, trainees, and volunteers working across more than 29 countries.

RREUSE represents the reuse and recycling of social enterprises, awareness, and research. The association also partners in international projects, working with universities and research centers such as the LOWaste Project or the Quali Pro Second Hand Project II. In 2011, RREUSE received the European Week for Waste Reduction award for that campaign.

== Origin ==
Interest in social enterprises working together in environmental services increased from 1999 to 2001. A few organizations from the social economy sector set up a few events and projects. Some organizations also started working together on the forthcoming European WEEE Directive (adopted in 2001) to address concerns about the possible impact of the WEEE Directive on social enterprises working in the recycling and reuse sector. In November 2000, a decision was made to develop a European network of social enterprises working in the waste sector to provide a forum for political debates and unfolding legislation in Brussels more regularly.

A network of 17 social enterprises was constituted on February 26, 2001. Representatives from the European Parliament, the Belgium Ministry for Social Economy, and the Directorate Environment of the European Commission expressed their general support. RREUSE was founded in August 2022 under Belgian law as a non-profit organization.

In 2003, RREUSE opened a secretariat for Belgium and international environmental and social NGOs at Mundo-B house, an ecologically renovated office building in the center of Brussels.

RREUSE members include:

1. AERESS (Spain)
2. Association Citizens "Hands" (Bosnia & Herzegovina)
3. Associazione Orius (Italy)
4. BKN (Netherlands)
5. Cooperativa Sociale Insieme (Ireland)
6. CRNI (Ireland)
7. CRNS (UK)
8. Dobrote z.b.o (Slovenia)
9. donateNYC (United States)
10. Ecological Recycling Society (Greece)
11. EKON (Poland)
12. Emmaüs Europe
13. Emmaüs France (France)
14. ENVIE (France)
15. Herwin (Belgium)
16. Humana Nova (Croatia)
17. Humusz Szövetség (Hungary)
18. Kierrätyskeskus Oy (Finland)
19. Klimax Plus (Greece)
20. Macken (Sweden)
21. RECOSI (Ireland)
22. RehabRecycle (Ireland)
23. RepaNet (Austria)
24. RESSOURCES (Belgium)
25. Reuseful UK (UK)
26. Tramel Oy (Finland)
27. Uuskasutuskeskus (Estonia)

The network RREUSE has a non-bureaucratic structure.

Members meet three times a year to work on the different waste streams, such as:

- WEEE (Waste from electrical and electronic equipment)
- Textiles
- Bulky waste
- Bio-waste
- Resource consumption and product policies, etc.

Most of the work is carried out by volunteer members between meetings.

== Funding ==
RREUSE is financed by membership fees. The Belgian government provided seed funding to promote the organization's launch in the first two years. Later, the DG Environment and DG Education provided some funding.[8] Recently, [when?] RREUSE Recently RREUSE has received funding from the Fondation de France.

== See also ==
- Computer recycling
- Electronic waste
- Planned obsolescence
- European Ecodesign Directive
- Life-cycle assessment
- Waste hierarchy
- European Waste Hierarchy
- European Employment Strategy
- Social economy
- Social inclusion
- Biodegradable waste
