= EDay =

New Zealand ewaste collection initiative

The eDay logo

eDay was a New Zealand initiative to hold an annual ewaste collection day, started as Computer Access New Zealand (CANZ) to raise awareness of the potential dangers associated with electronic waste and to offer the opportunity for such waste to be disposed of in an environmentally friendly fashion.

== History ==
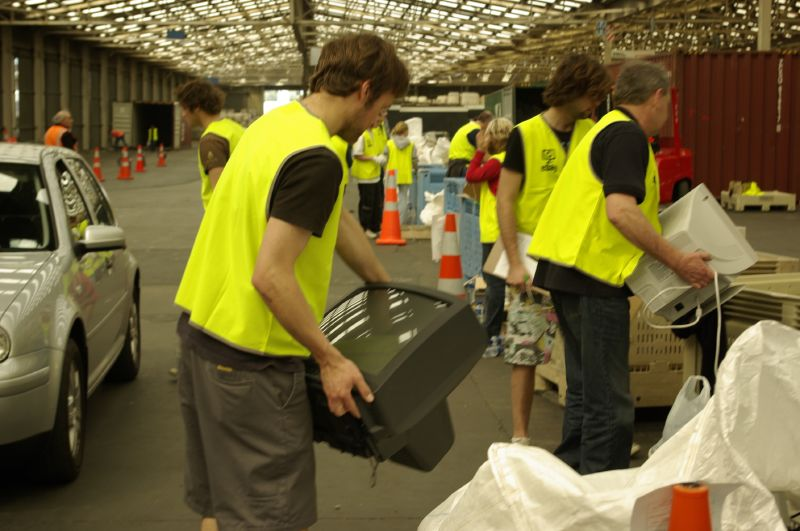
eDay in Dunedin, 2008

eDay was first held in Wellington in 2006, as a pilot sponsored by Dell, the event bought in 54 tonnes (119,000 lb) of old computers, mobile phones and other non-biodegradable electronic material. In 2007 the initiative was extended to cover 12 locations, which resulted in it becoming a national initiative, 946 tonnes (2,086,000 lb) were collected.

eDay 2008 was held on October 4 and extended to 32 centres. In 2009 an estimated 966 tonnes (2,130,000 lb) was collected at 38 locations around the country.

== Purpose ==
The initiative was started to minimise the amount of electronic waste being disposed on in landfills, based on evidence from reports that there was an estimated 16 million electronic devices in use in New Zealand and that 1 million new devices were being introduced every year, the report found that the majority of these devices were being disposed in landfills rather than being recycled. A separate report found that half of New Zealand schools did not recycle outdated and replaced equipment, opting instead to deposit it in landfills. When disposed in landfills there is a possibility of the harmful chemicals in the electronic equipment, such as mercury, lead and cadmium, contaminating groundwater and coming into contact with humans or animals, the toxins in the chemicals are capable of causing serious health issues, such as nervous system and brain damage. When recycled, the chemicals are disposed of safely and potentially valuable parts can be reused.

== Initiative ==
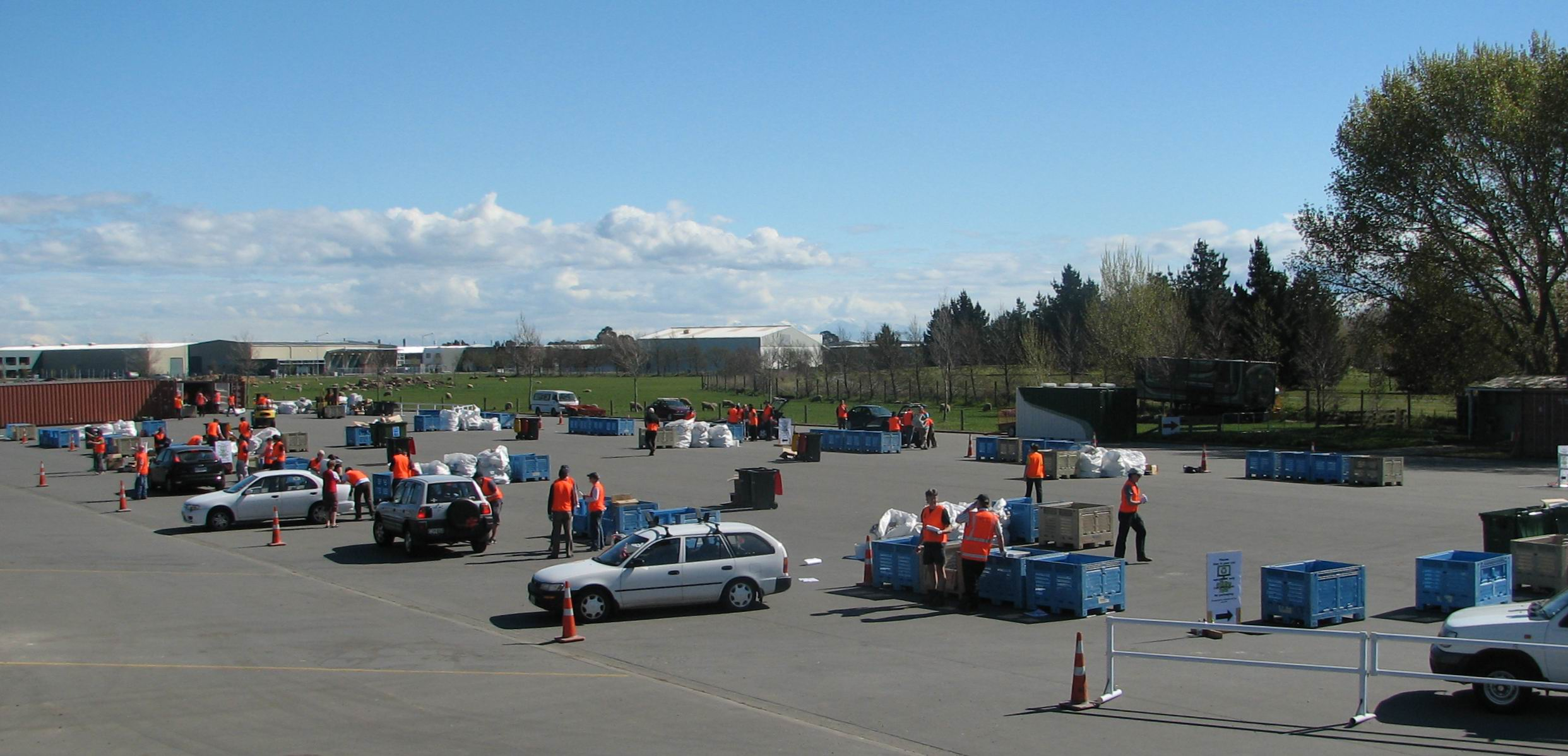
In Christchurch, the 2009 event was held at the Canterbury Agricultural Park.

On the day, drive-thru collection points are established and volunteers operate each centre. Businesses, schools and the public are encouraged to dispose of old computer hardware, mobile phones and printer cartridges. As well as collecting material, the initiative is also designed to increase awareness about the harmful effects of electronic waste.

== Acclaim ==
CANZ were awarded the New Zealand Ministry for the Environment 2008 Green Ribbon Award for Community action and involvement.

In 2009 CANZ won the Outstanding Industry Initiative in the PricewaterhouseCoopers Hi-Tech Awards.

== See also ==
- Computer recycling
- Electronic waste in New Zealand
- E-Cycling
