= China RoHS =

Chinese government regulation on materials

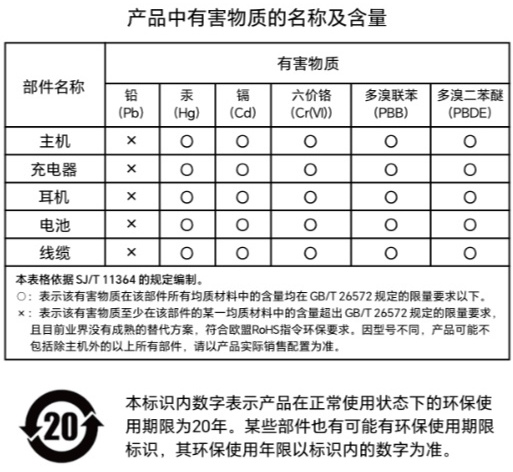
A China RoHS statement, including substances list and EFUP label information

China RoHS (Restriction of Hazardous Substances), officially known as Administrative Measure on the Control of Pollution Caused by Electronic Information Products, is a Chinese government regulation to control certain materials, including lead. The Ministry of Industry and Information Technology (MIIT) of China is responsible for approval and publication of China's RoHS regulations.

"Administration on the Control of Pollution Caused by Electronic Information Products" (ACPEIP or China RoHS I) was released in 2006 by the MIIT. China RoHS I was replaced by the newest regulation, "Management Methods for the Restriction of the Use of Hazardous Substances in Electrical and Electronic Products" (China RoHS II), which went into effect July 1, 2016.

China RoHS II expanded the product scope of China RoHS I from Electronic Information Products (EIP) to Electrical and Electronic Products (EEP). Products listed in the EEP Catalogue must comply with hazardous substance restriction limits for lead, mercury, cadmium, hexavalent chromium, polybrominated biphenyl (PBB) and polybrominated diphenyl ether (PBDE), unless they fall into the Exemptions List.

All items shipped to China must be marked with its proper marking for the restriction of the use of hazardous substances per standard SJ/T 11364 as to whether the item is compliant or non-compliant. The EEP logo is used to mark parts and assemblies that do not contain unacceptable amounts of substances identified by the regulations, and that are environmentally safe. Items that do contain hazardous substances are marked with the EEP logo including an Environment Friendly Use Period (EFUP) value in years. Furthermore, per standard SJ/T 11364, a table in simplified Chinese must be included in the product manual guide specifying whether or not any of the hazardous substances exceed the threshold at the homogenous level.

== China RoHS banned substances ==
There are currently six substances considered environmentally hazardous by the China RoHS II directive as specified in standard GB/T 26572-2011. The substances followed by its restriction limits are below.

1. Lead, 0.1%
2. Mercury, 0.1%
3. Cadmium, 0.01%
4. Hexavalent chromium, 0.1%
5. Polybrominated biphenyls, 0.1%
6. Polybrominated diphenyl ethers, 0.1%

Similar to EU RoHS 2 directive, China RoHS II allows for technology exemptions.

== Possible Future Additions of RoHS Substances ==
According to the China Electronics Standardization Institute, MIIT is considering the addition of four new substances to the China RoHS regulation. The four new substances are phthalates, namely:

- Bis(2-ethylhexyl) phthalate (DEHP)
- Butyl benzyl phthalate (BBP)
- Dibutyl phthalate (DBP)
- Diisobutyl phthalate (DIBP)

If the amendment passes, China will have the same RoHS substances as the 2015 EU RoHS amendment. The expected publication date of the regulation is July 2022. The addition of phthalates to the RoHS regulation would advance China's green industrial development program, which is part of their 14th Five-Year Plan.

== Environment Friendly Use Period ==
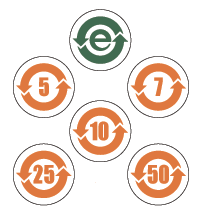
Examples of EFUP labels

Environment Friendly Use Period (EFUP) is the period of time before any of the RoHS substances are likely to leak out, causing possible harm to health and the environment. Each product that contains RoHS substances above the maximum permitted concentration values is labelled with an orange circle composed of two arrows containing a number that gives the EFUP in years; for example, a circled 10 indicates an EFUP of 10 years. A special EFUP label containing the letter "e" indicates that the product contains less than the maximum concentration value (MCV) of all six hazardous substances. The EFUP calculation methods are described in SJ/Z 11388-2009.

== Mandatory compliance product type ==
Mandatory compliance to China RoHS II restriction limits are applicable to Fifteen product types

1. Air conditioners
2. Electric water heaters
3. Fax machines
4. Miniature computers
5. Mobile communication devices
6. Monitors
7. Photocopiers
8. Printers
9. Refrigerators
10. Telephones
11. Televisions
12. Washing machines
13. Mini Fan
14. Powerbank
15. Electric Gadget

== See also ==
- Restriction of Hazardous Substances Directive, a similar set of regulations in force in Europe.
- Electronic waste in China
