= Basel Convention =

1992 international environmental treaty on waste disposal

Basel Convention on the Control of Transboundary Movements of Hazardous Wastes and Their Disposal
- Logo of the Basel Convention Secretariat
- Type: United Nations treaty
- Signed: 22 March 1989
- Location: Basel, Switzerland
- Effective: 5 May 1992
- Condition: Ninety days after the ratification by at least 20 signatory states
- Signatories: 53
- Parties: 191
- Depositary: Secretary-General of the United Nations
- Languages: Arabic, Chinese, English, French, Russian, Spanish

Full text
- Basel Convention at Wikisource
- basel.int

The Basel Convention on the Control of Transboundary Movements of Hazardous Wastes and Their Disposal, usually known as the Basel Convention, is an international treaty that was designed to reduce the movements of hazardous waste between nations, and specifically to restrict the transfer of hazardous waste from developed to less developed countries. It does not address the movement of radioactive waste, controlled by the International Atomic Energy Agency. The Basel Convention is also intended to minimize the rate and toxicity of wastes generated, to ensure their environmentally sound management as closely as possible to the source of generation, and to assist developing countries in environmentally sound management of the hazardous and other wastes they generate.

Parties to the Convention

The convention was opened for signature on 21 March 1989 and entered into force on 5 May 1992. As of June 2024, there were 191 parties to the convention. In addition, Haiti and the United States signed the convention but did not ratify it.

Following a petition urging action on the issue signed by more than a million people around the world, most of the world's countries, but not the United States, agreed in May 2019 to an amendment of the Basel Convention to include plastic waste as regulated material. Although the United States is not a party to the treaty, export shipments of plastic waste from the United States are now "criminal traffic as soon as the ships get on the high seas", according to the Basel Action Network, and carriers of such shipments may face liability, because the transportation of plastic waste is prohibited in just about every other country.

== History ==
With the tightening of environmental laws (for example, RCRA) in developed nations in the 1970s, disposal costs for hazardous waste rose dramatically. At the same time, the globalization of shipping made cross-border movement of waste easier, and many less developed countries were desperate for foreign currency. Consequently, the trade in hazardous waste, particularly to poorer countries, grew rapidly. In 1990, OECD countries exported around 1.8 million tons of hazardous waste. Although most of this waste was shipped to other developed countries, a number of high-profile incidents of hazardous waste-dumping led to calls for regulation.

One of the incidents which led to the creation of the Basel Convention was the Khian Sea waste disposal incident, in which a ship carrying incinerator ash from the city of Philadelphia in the United States dumped half of its load on a beach in Haiti before being forced away. It sailed for many months, changing its name several times. Unable to unload the cargo in any port, the crew was believed to have dumped much of it at sea.

Another incident was a 1988 case in which five ships transported 8,000 barrels of hazardous waste from Italy to the small Nigerian town of Koko in exchange for $100 monthly rent which was paid to a Nigerian for the use of his farmland.

At its meeting that took place from 27 November to 1 December 2006, the parties of the Basel Agreement focused on issues of electronic waste and the dismantling of ships.

Increased trade in recyclable materials has led to an increase in a market for used products such as computers. This market is valued in billions of dollars. At issue is the distinction when used computers stop being a "commodity" and become a "waste".

As of June 2023, there are 191 parties to the treaty, which includes 188 UN member states, the Cook Islands, the European Union, and the State of Palestine. The five UN member states that are not party to the treaty are East Timor, Fiji, Haiti, South Sudan, and United States.

== Definition of hazardous waste ==
Waste falls under the scope of the convention if it is within the category of wastes listed in Annex I of the convention and it exhibits one of the hazardous characteristics contained in Annex III. In other words, it must both be listed and possess a characteristic such as being explosive, flammable, toxic, or corrosive. The other way that a waste may fall under the scope of the convention is if it is defined as or considered to be a hazardous waste under the laws of either the exporting country, the importing country, or any of the countries of transit.

The definition of the term disposal is made in Article 2 al 4 and just refers to annex IV, which gives a list of operations which are understood as disposal or recovery. Examples of disposal are broad, including recovery and recycling.

Alternatively, to fall under the scope of the convention, it is sufficient for waste to be included in Annex II, which lists other wastes, such as household wastes and residue that comes from incinerating household waste.

Radioactive waste that is covered under other international control systems and wastes from the normal operation of ships are not covered.

Annex IX attempts to define wastes which are not considered hazardous wastes and which would be excluded from the scope of the Basel Convention. If these wastes however are contaminated with hazardous materials to an extent causing them to exhibit an Annex III characteristic, they are not excluded.

== Obligations ==
In addition to conditions on the import and export of the above wastes, there are stringent requirements for notice, consent and tracking for movement of wastes across national boundaries. The convention places a general prohibition on the exportation or importation of wastes between parties and non-parties. The exception to this rule is where the waste is subject to another treaty that does not take away from the Basel Convention. The United States is a notable non-party to the convention and has a number of such agreements for allowing the shipping of hazardous wastes to Basel Party countries.

The OECD Council also has its own control system that governs the transboundary movement of hazardous materials between OECD member countries. This allows, among other things, the OECD countries to continue trading in wastes with countries like the United States that have not ratified the Basel Convention.

Parties to the convention must honor import bans of other parties.

Article 4 of the Basel Convention calls for an overall reduction of waste generation. By encouraging countries to keep wastes within their boundaries and as close as possible to its source of generation, the internal pressures should provide incentives for waste reduction and pollution prevention. Parties are generally prohibited from exporting covered wastes to, or importing covered waste from, non-parties to the convention.

The convention states that illegal hazardous waste traffic is criminal but contains no enforcement provisions.

According to Article 12, parties are directed to adopt a protocol that establishes liability rules and procedures that are appropriate for damage that comes from the movement of hazardous waste across borders.

The current consensus is that as space is not classed as a "country" under the specific definition, export of e-waste to non-terrestrial locations would not be covered.

== Basel Ban Amendment ==
After the initial adoption of the convention, some least developed countries and environmental organizations argued that it did not go far enough. Many nations and NGOs argued for a total ban on shipment of all hazardous waste to developing countries. In particular, the original convention did not prohibit waste exports to any location except Antarctica but merely required a notification and consent system known as "prior informed consent" or PIC. Further, many waste traders sought to exploit the good name of recycling and begin to justify all exports as moving to recycling destinations. Many believed a full ban was needed including exports for recycling. These concerns led to several regional waste trade bans, including the Bamako Convention.

Lobbying at 1995 Basel conference by developing countries, Greenpeace and several European countries such as Denmark, led to the adoption of an amendment to the convention in 1995 termed the Basel Ban Amendment to the Basel Convention. The amendment has been accepted by 86 countries and the European Union, but has not entered into force (as that requires ratification by three-fourths of the member states to the convention). On 6 September 2019, Croatia became the 97th country to ratify the amendment which will enter into force after 90 days on 5 December 2019. The amendment prohibits the export of hazardous waste from a list of developed (mostly OECD) countries to developing countries. The Basel Ban applies to export for any reason, including recycling. An area of special concern for advocates of the amendment was the sale of ships for salvage, shipbreaking. The Ban Amendment was strenuously opposed by a number of industry groups as well as nations including Australia and Canada. The number of ratification for the entry-into force of the Ban Amendment is under debate: Amendments to the convention enter into force after ratification of "three-fourths of the Parties who accepted them" [Art. 17.5]; so far, the parties of the Basel Convention could not yet agree whether this would be three-fourths of the parties that were party to the Basel Convention when the ban was adopted, or three-fourths of the current parties of the convention [see Report of COP 9 of the Basel Convention]. The status of the amendment ratifications can be found on the Basel Secretariat's web page. The European Union fully implemented the Basel Ban in its Waste Shipment Regulation (EWSR), making it legally binding in all EU member states. Norway and Switzerland have similarly fully implemented the Basel Ban in their legislation.

In the light of the blockage concerning the entry into force of the Ban Amendment, Switzerland and Indonesia have launched a "Country-led Initiative" (CLI) to discuss in an informal manner a way forward to ensure that the trans boundary movements of hazardous wastes, especially to developing countries and countries with economies in the transition, do not lead to an unsound management of hazardous wastes. This discussion aims at identifying and finding solutions to the reasons why hazardous wastes are still brought to countries that are not able to treat them in a safe manner. It is hoped that the CLI will contribute to the realization of the objectives of the Ban Amendment. The Basel Convention's website informs about the progress of this initiative.

== Regulation of plastic waste ==
In the wake of popular outcry, in May 2019 most of the world's countries, but not the United States, agreed to amend the Basel Convention to include plastic waste as a regulated material. The world's oceans are estimated to contain 100 million metric tons of plastic, with up to 90% of this quantity originating in land-based sources. The United States, which produces an annual 42 million metric tons of plastic waste, more than any other country in the world, opposed the amendment, but since it is not a party to the treaty it did not have an opportunity to vote on it to try to block it. Information about, and visual images of, wildlife, such as seabirds, ingesting plastic, and scientific findings that nanoparticles do penetrate through the blood–brain barrier were reported to have fueled public sentiment for coordinated international legally binding action. Over a million people worldwide signed a petition demanding official action. Although the United States is not a party to the treaty, export shipments of plastic waste from the United States are now "criminal traffic as soon as the ships get on the high seas," according to the Basel Action Network (BAN), and carriers of such shipments may face liability, because the Basel Convention as amended in May 2019 prohibits the transportation of plastic waste to just about every other country.

The Basel Convention contains three main entries on plastic wastes in Annex II, VIII and IX of the convention. The Plastic Waste Amendments of the convention are now binding on 186 States. In addition to ensuring the trade in plastic waste is more transparent and better regulated, under the Basel Convention governments must take steps not only to ensure the environmentally sound management of plastic waste, but also to tackle plastic waste at its source.

== Basel watchdog ==
The Basel Action Network (BAN) is a charitable civil society non-governmental organization that works as a consumer watchdog for implementation of the Basel Convention. BAN's principal aims is fighting exportation of toxic waste, including plastic waste, from industrialized societies to developing countries. BAN is based in Seattle, Washington, United States, with a partner office in the Philippines. BAN works to curb trans-border trade in hazardous electronic waste, land dumping, incineration, and the use of prison labor.

== See also ==
- Asbestos and the law
- Bamako Convention
- Electronic waste by country
- Rotterdam Convention
- Stockholm Convention
