= Landbell =

German waste take-back service provider

Coordinates: 49°59′45″N 8°16′48″E

Landbell AG für Rückhol-Systeme
- Type: Private
- Industry: Waste, Environ Service, Equipment
- Founded: 1995; 31 years ago in Mainz, Germany
- Founder: Frank Binder
- Headquarters: Mainz, Germany
- Key people: Jan Patrick Schulz (CEO); Karen Rieck (CFO)
- Owner: Frank Binder
- Number of employees: 480 (2025)

Landbell AG für Rückhol-Systeme – or Landbell Group - is a service provider that carries out take-back and recycling obligations for companies. It supports companies in meeting their extended producer responsibility (EPR) obligations and other product and packaging related requirements. The company operates worldwide through its own network of producer responsibility organisations (PROs). Landbell Group's head office is located in Mainz.

== History ==
Landbell AG was founded in September 1995 as a local waste management company in Germany. Its aim was to support companies with their obligation to take back and recycle their sales packaging. It developed its own take-back scheme in a pilot project in cooperation with the Lahn-Dill district. In August 2003, Landbell was approved as a packaging compliance scheme in the federal state of Hesse. Up to this point, Duales System Deutschland GmbH (DSD) had been the only such option in Germany. In August 2006, Landbell was approved nationwide as a packaging compliance scheme. In 2009, the business started to support companies based abroad with their recycling obligations in Germany.

== Expansion ==
In 2014 they merged with European Recycling Platform (ERP) and founded the Landbell Group. ERP had been created in 2002 by Hewlett-Packard, Electrolux, Sony and Procter & Gamble in response to the introduction of the European Union's Waste Electrical and Electronic Equipment (WEEE) Directive, and the Batteries Directive which was adopted in 2006. Landbell Group expanded its services to include WEEE and batteries in 15 countries.

Since 2014, Landbell Group acquired further companies, including H2 Compliance (in 2016), and holds shares in numerous other companies, including TerraCycle GmbH in the DACH region.

Landbell Group has announced in 2025 that it is collaborating with PureCycle collaborate to advance polypropylene plastic recycling in Europe.

In 2015, PureCycle Technologies, in partnership with consumer goods company P&G, headquartered in Cincinnati, began construction on a plant in Lawrence County, Ohio, that is designed to recycle polypropylene (PP) plastic to “virgin-like” quality.

The patented technology employed at the facility was developed in P&G labs. P&G licensed the technology to PureCycle, a portfolio company of Chicago-based Innventure, a Wasson Enterprise Partnership, also based in Chicago, that “commercializes disruptive technologies

Founded in 2015, PureCycle’s small-scale plant in Lawrence County will test and calibrate the PP recycling process. The plant will begin operating in January 2018, according to a news release issued by PureCycle, and the full-scale plant will open in 2020.

== Company structure and memberships ==
Jan Patrick Schulz is CEO of Landbell Group since 1 July 2007. Karen Rieck is CFO since 2024. Frank Binder is the main shareholder since the company‘s foundation. The company has been family-owned for over 20 years. Today, the group of companies is represented in many locations in over 20 countries worldwide and employs around 480 employees from 39 nations. In 2024, the company operated 43 approved take-back schemes for batteries, packaging, textiles and WEEE in 18 countries.

In 2019, Landbell Group joined the waste and recycling alliance, Prevent. The alliance was established by the German Federal Ministry for Economic Cooperation and Development to promote the expansion of a functioning waste and recycling management system in emerging and developing countries.

Landbell Group facilitated the founding of a US nonprofit tax exempt organization, registered under the US Internal Revenue Code as a 501(c)(3). The group is called Landbell USA and is the designated CalRecycle approved Producer Responsibility Organization (PRO) for SB 707 under California law regarding large producer and sellers obligations to ensure recycling of clothing and textiles. Landbell USA is a part of Landbell Group, an organization with over 30 years of global leadership in Extended Producer Responsibility operations. We operate 41 PROs in 17 countries, including being one of the world’s first Textile PROs in the Netherlands. By integrating best practices in these proven international methodologies with the specific regulatory requirements of SB 707, it provides a robust, audit-ready compliance solution for the affected producers in the California market. On the other hand, Landbell USA The actual operational relationship is uncertain, as Landbell USA also states that Landbell USA has no commercial connection with the Landbell Group. Landbell USA, a 501(c)(3) nonprofit company, has no beneficial owner and as such is independent of Landbell Group. Landbell Group is providing technical support and advice on the establishment of the PRO based on its extensive experience of setting up and managing more than 40 PROs around the world.

As an international company, Landbell Group offers solutions for producers and retailers to help them comply with their obligations under global environmental and chemical legislation. This is done through the operation of take-back schemes for batteries, packaging, textiles and WEEE, as well as worldwide consulting and compliance services relating to EPR and chemicals legislation.
