= Recycler =

Recycler or Recyclers may refer to:

== Environment ==
- Recycling, the process of converting waste materials into new materials and objects

== People ==
- Recycler (person), waste collector
- Recycler, waste picker in developing countries

== Technology ==
- Recycler (facility), a materials recovery facility
  - Singlestream recycler, processor of unsorted material
  - Electronic waste recyclers, a facility that processes e-waste
    - Computer recycler, a facility that processes computer recycling
  - Vehicle recycler, a facility that handles vehicle recycling
- Road recycler, engineering vehicle

=== Associations and companies ===
- Professional Electrical Apparatus Recyclers League, professional organization and standards group based in Denver, Colorado
- ReCellular, recycler and reseller of cell phones

== Media ==
=== Publications ===
- The Recycler Los Angeles based, classifieds only newspaper

=== Film and TV ===
- Cyborg 3: The Recycler, 1995 direct-to-video sequel to Cyborg 2

=== Music ===
- Recycler (group), French electro-world duo Bruno Weiss (Tcherno) and Fabrice Charlot (Fab)
- Recycler (album) by ZZ Top
- Recycler Tour by ZZ Top
- "Recycler", song by Modey Lemon from Modey Lemon
