= Appliance recycling =

Process of dismantling scrapped home appliance for reuse

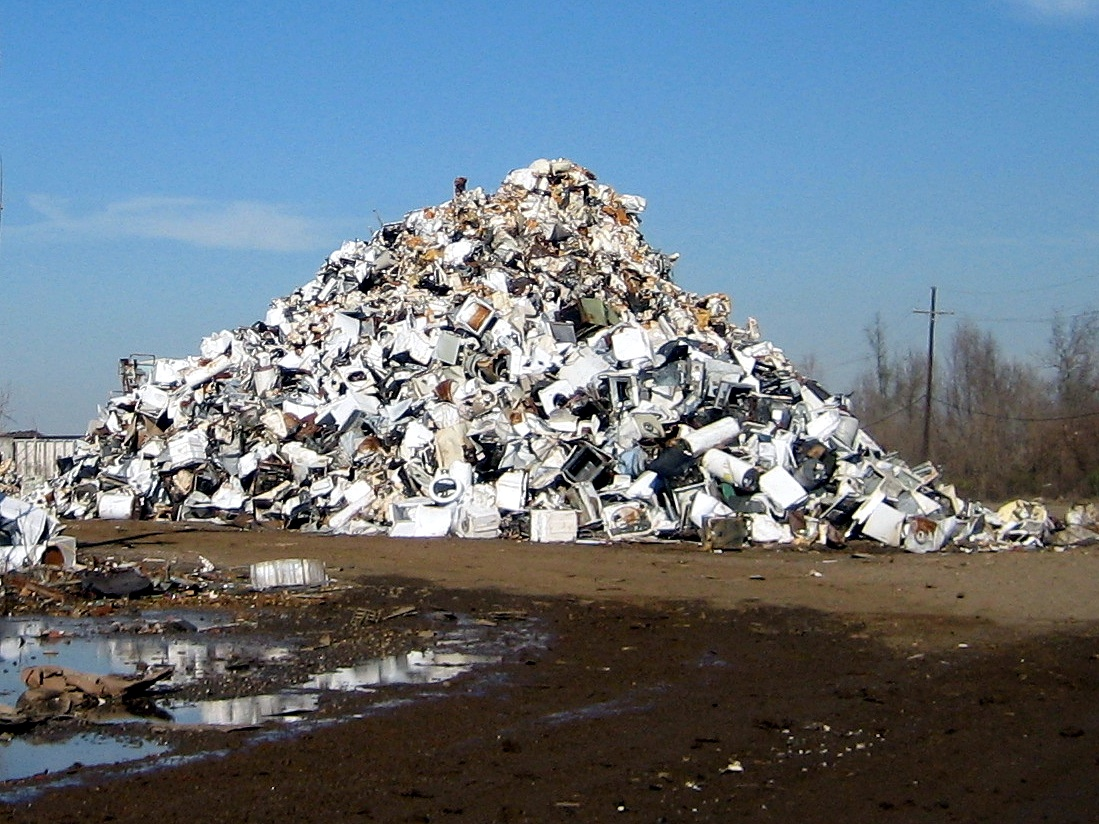
New Orleans after Hurricane Katrina: mounds of trashed appliances with a few smashed automobiles mixed in, waiting to be scrapped

Appliance recycling is the process of dismantling scrapped home appliances to recover their parts or materials for reuse. Recycling appliances for their original or other purposes, involves disassembly, removal of hazardous components and destruction of the equipment to recover materials, generally by shredding, sorting and grading. The rate at which appliances are discarded has increased due in part to obsolescence due to technological advancement, and in part to not being designed to be repairable. The main types of appliances that are recycled are televisions, refrigerators, air conditioners, washing machines, and computers. When appliances are recycled, they can be looked upon as a valuable resources; if disposed of improperly, they can be environmentally harmful and poison ecosystems.

The strength of appliance recycling legislation and the percentage of appliances recycled varies around the world.

== Disassembly ==
A key part of appliance recycling is the manual dismantling of each product, removing hazardous components, and recovering reusable materials and parts. Procedures vary and depend on the appliance type. The amount of hazardous components able to be removed also depends on the type of appliance. Low removal rates of hazardous components reduce the recyclability of valuable materials. Each type of appliance has its own set of characteristics and components. This makes characterization of appliances essential to sorting and separating parts. Research on appliance dismantling has become an active area, intending to help recycling reach maximum efficiency.

=== Classification ===
There is a certain process used to recover materials from appliances. Parts are generally removed in order from largest to smallest. Metals are extracted first and then plastics. Materials are sorted by either size, shape, or density. Sizing is a good means of sorting to quicken future processing. It also classifies fractions that show composition. Materials report to larger or finer fractions based on original dimension, toughness, or brittleness. Shape classification contributes to the dynamics of the material. Classification by density is important when it comes to determining the use of a material.

=== Example ===
Batteries and copper are sorted out first for quality control purposes. The materials are then compacted. Next, iron and steel (ferrous metals) are extracted using electromagnets. They are collected and made ready for sale. Then metals are separated from non-metals using eddy currents created by rapidly alternating magnetic fields, which induce metals to jump away from non-metals. Then water separation is used to sort plastics and glass from circuit boards and copper wires. Circuit boards and copper content is then sold. Plastics and glass are further compacted for reuse.

== Recycling by region ==
Although appliance recycling is relatively new, several countries have enacted laws and regulations regarding electric waste. The first countries to establish home appliance recycling included Japan, Switzerland, Sweden, the Netherlands, and Germany.

=== European Union ===
In 2003 the Waste Electrical and Electronic Equipment Directive (WEEE) became European Law. It sets collection, recycling and recovery targets for all types of electrical goods.

=== Japan ===
By the 1950s and 60s Japan had already become a major producer of electric appliances. The first initiatives to recycle were launched in the 70s. Due to costs, disassembly was hardly achievable. The Home Appliance Recycling Law was enacted in 1998 and came into force in 2001, and recycling of waste electrics became a legal requirement under the Specific Household Appliance Recycling Law and the Law for Promotion of Effective Utilisation Resources. Appliance manufacturers are now required to finance the recycling of their products. The Association for Electric Home Appliances is a trade group that is responsible for orphaned products.

=== China ===
China produces a significant proportion of the world's appliances, and imports a large quantity of waste appliances. There has not been much progress in appliance recycling efficiency. China's undeveloped dismantling and processing has led to elevated levels of toxic chemicals in and near waste appliance sites.

=== United States ===
The United States is the largest waste appliance producer in the world. There is no federal law requiring appliance recycling; legislation varies between states. On a state level, many mandatory electronic recovery programs have been implemented. There are several commercial appliance recyclers.

==== California ====
In 2003, the California Electronic Waste Recycling Act was signed. It established a new program for consumers to return, recycle, and ensure the safe and environmentally sound disposal of video display devices, such as televisions and computer monitors, that are hazardous wastes when discarded. In 2005, consumers began paying a 6-10 dollar fee when buying an electronic device. These fees are used to pay e-waste collectors and recyclers to cover their cost of managing e-waste. The EWRA classifies e-waste by dividing the products into two categories: electronic devices and covered electronic devices. Only covered electronic devices (CEDs) are included in the EWRA, however all electronic devices needed recycling measures to be taken. The CEDs include televisions and computers that have LCD displays or contain cathode-ray tubes.

=== Australia ===
There are several commercial appliance recyclers in Australia. Some organisations that remove waste appliances and offer government-sponsored rebates. Some retailers including Appliances Online remove and recycle customers' old appliances.

=== New Zealand ===
In New Zealand there is a push to keep old appliances and e-waste out of landfills, however there is little legislation to preventing this. As in Australia there are companies including the manufacturer Fisher and Paykel that remove waste appliances and recycle them.

== EPR ==
Extended producer responsibility (EPR) is defined as an environmental protection strategy that makes the manufacturer of the appliance responsible for its entire life cycle and especially for the “take-back”, recycling and final disposal of the product. Essentially, manufacturers must now finance product treatment and recycling. Countries where this strategy has been adopted for waste appliances are: Switzerland (1998), Denmark (1999), Netherlands (1999), Norway (1999), Belgium (2001), Japan (2001), Sweden (2001) and Germany (2005), but it has also been expanded through legislation among certain South American countries such as Argentina, Brazil, Colombia and Peru. Countries in which EPR has long been established, demonstrate that the combination of government legislation and sound company practices can produce a higher take-back and recycling rate. An example of this is the Sony Corporation in Japan, achieving a 53% recycling rate. Other ways countries approach the issue of waste appliances is either by offering recycling facilities or banning importation. Almost all countries, at least offer facilities that aid in appliance recycling. Many implement extended producer responsibility, in addition to recycling facilities.

== See also ==
- Electronic waste
- Computer recycling
- Mobile phone recycling
