= Computers for Schools =

Computers for Schools may refer to:

- Computers for Schools (Canada), a Canadian program founded in 1993
- Computers for Schools, a scheme operated by the British retailer Tesco

== See also ==
- Computers for African Schools (UK)
- Computer technology for developing areas
- Computers in the classroom
- Educational technology
