= Cost of recycling computers =

The Cost of recycling computers might refer to:

- Computer recycling
- Electronic waste
