= Recycling in the Netherlands =

Recycling in the Netherlands is under the responsibility of local authorities. Different localities implement different systems, and also within a municipality there can be multiple regimes. Municipalities publish a yearly calendar of the pickup dates and the addresses of the waste separation and recycling stations.

== Collection processes ==
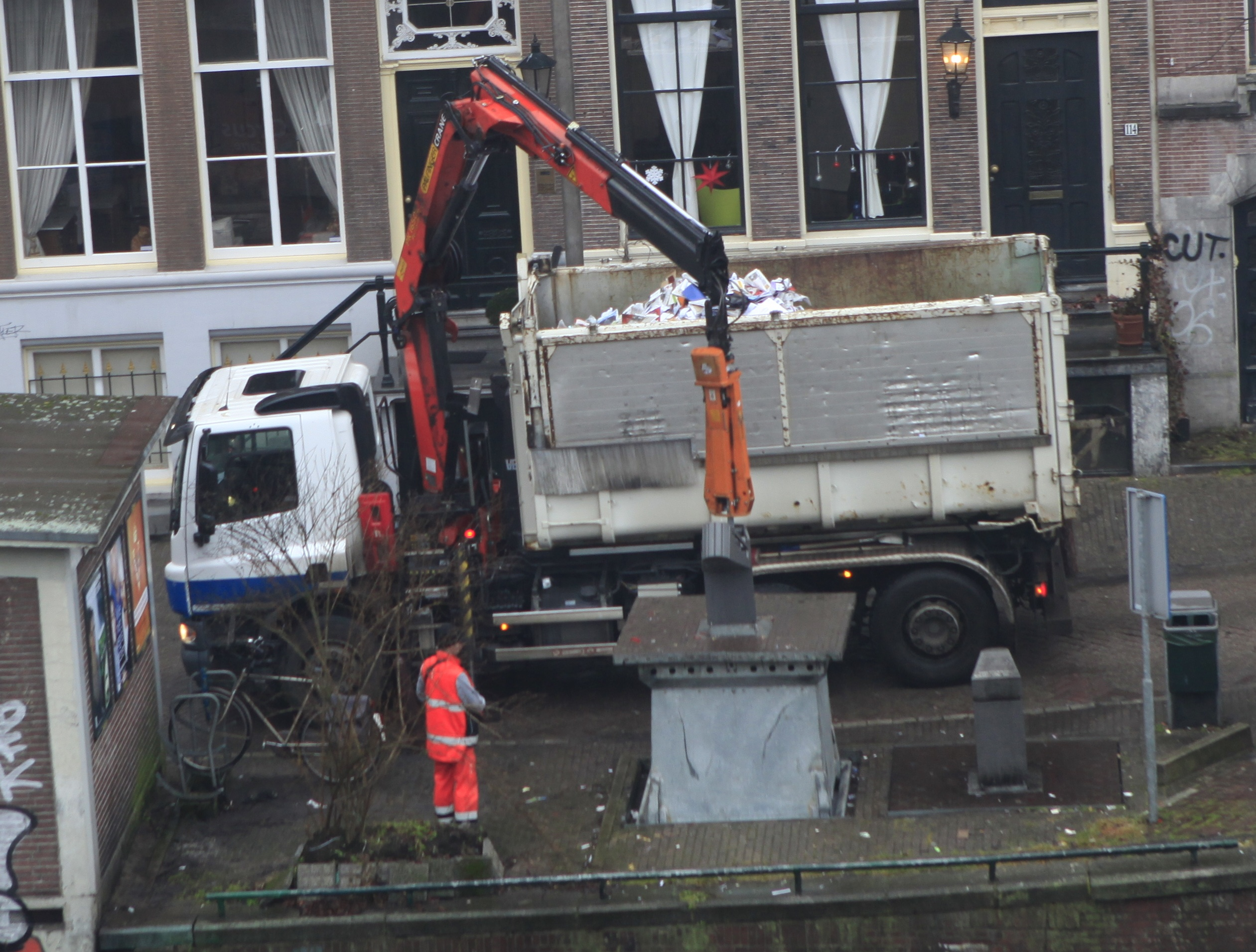
Paper recycling pickup in Amsterdam, 2011

The curbside collection systems for recyclates employed vary across the Netherlands:

- Biodegradable waste, "GFT" ("Groente-, Fruit-, en Tuinafval") – Green bin, or combined bin with residual waste (black/green bins), or underground waste containers. Collected in almost all municipalities except some quarters of major cities
- Paper/paperboard – Blue bin, or combined bin with plastic (blue/orange bins), or underground waste containers. Or put curbside in a cardboard box. Collected in almost all municipalities and in most major cities
- Plastic/cans – Orange bin, or combined with paper (blue/orange bins), or underground waste containers. Collected in some municipalities and in most major cities

=== Recyclable waste collected elsewhere ===
- Plastic bottles – collected with container-deposit legislation-systems, €0.15 for <0,5L, €0,25 for >0,5L
- Glass jars and bottles – common collection points. Since 1972
  - Beer bottles - collected with container-deposit legislation, €0,10 for <0,5L, €0,25 for >0,5L
- Textile – Textile containers in most cities
- Household hazardous waste, "KCA" ("Klein Chemisch Afval") – civic amenity sites
  - Batteries / fluorescent lamps – civic amenity sites, and some supermarkets (WeCycle bins)
  - Medication – civic amenity sites, and pharmacies
- Tires – civic amenity sites
- Ink cartridge – can be filled in stores again, or returned to collection points (WeCycle bins)
- Timber – civic amenity sites
- Household appliances – can be returned through shop when buying new products, or civic amenity sites

== Municipality recycling facilities ==
All municipalities are required to provide known collection points for recyclable and/or hazardous materials. All types of separated trash can be accepted here for free or a small sum depending on type of material (green stuff and concrete/bricks is usually free). Some stores perform collection of chemicals (paint, batteries). There are a great number of second-hand shops (run by charity organisations) that accept goods for processing, which consists of re-use, recycling and burning it as fuel.

== Facts and figures ==
Landfill usage has been lowered significantly from 13% in 1992 to 3% in 2016. Dutch household waste recycling averages 49% (2012).

The amount of separated household waste in the Netherlands was around 60% in 2014. The Dutch government wants 75% of household waste to be separated by 2020, which means that waste will decrease from 250 kilograms per capita per year to 100 kilograms per capita per year in 2020.

== EU regulations ==
National law concerning recycling is heavily influenced by EU regulations. Reforms may have great impact on national collection systems (for instance a downgrade of the recycling system is imaginable, when deposits on types of drink containers are lifted). Also, the environmental impact of industry is closely guarded by EU standards.

== Deposit systems ==
Deposit systems are in use for beer bottles, larger plastic bottles, and plastic crates for bottles. For these items, the deposit (or statiegeld) is returned by automated machines at supermarkets. A video of such a machine in use and returning the deposit is available on YouTube.

Gas bottles and household appliances are also covered by this. Although for these the money is never returned, it requires a shop owner to accept the discarded item it replaces, if handed in. The used term is "verwijderingsbijdrage" or "removal fee". Extra earnings from this system are spent on investments in the recycling industry.

On 24 April 2020, the State Secretary for Infrastructure and Water Management Stientje van Veldhoven announced that plastic bottles smaller than 1L will be subject to a €0.15 deposit, starting on 1 July 2021. Beverage cans will be subject to a deposit in 2022 if the industry doesn't succeed to reduce the presence of cans in the environment with 70% in 2021. Dutch environmental organisations acclaimed the decision.

== See also ==
- Container-deposit legislation
