= Electronic waste recycling =

Form of recycling

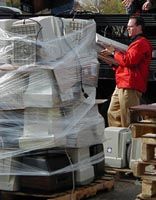
Computer monitors are typically packed into low stacks on wooden pallets for recycling and then shrink-wrapped.

Electronic waste recycling, electronics recycling, or e-waste recycling is the disassembly and separation of components and raw materials of waste electronics; when referring to specific types of e-waste, the terms like computer recycling or mobile phone recycling may be used. Like other waste streams, reuse, donation, and repair are common sustainable ways to dispose of information technology (IT) waste.

Since its inception in the early 1990s, more and more devices are being recycled worldwide due to increased awareness and investment. Electronic recycling occurs primarily to recover valuable, rare-earth metals and precious metals, which are in short supply, as well as plastics and metals. These are resold or used in new devices after purification, in effect creating a circular economy. Such processes involve specialised facilities and premises, but within the home or ordinary workplace, sound components of damaged or obsolete computers can often be reused, reducing replacement costs.

Recycling is considered environmentally friendly because it prevents hazardous waste, including heavy metals and carcinogens, from entering the atmosphere, landfill, or waterways. While electronics make up a small fraction of total waste generated, they are far more dangerous. There is stringent legislation designed to enforce and encourage the sustainable disposal of appliances, the most notable being the Waste Electrical and Electronic Equipment Directive of the European Union and the United States National Computer Recycling Act. In 2009, 38% of computers and a quarter of total electronic waste were recycled in the United States, 5% and 3% up from 3 years prior, respectively.

== Reasons for recycling ==
Obsolete computers and old electronics are valuable sources for secondary raw materials if recycled; otherwise, these devices are a source of toxins and carcinogens. Rapid technology change, low initial cost, and planned obsolescence have resulted in a fast-growing surplus of computers and other electronic components around the globe. Technical solutions are available, but in most cases a legal framework, collection system, logistics, and other services need to be implemented before applying a technical solution. The U.S. Environmental Protection Agency, estimates 30 to 40 million surplus PCs, classified as "hazardous household waste", would be ready for end-of-life management in the next few years. The U.S. National Safety Council estimates that 75% of all personal computers ever sold are now surplus electronics. Recoverable raw materials contained in global e-waste have been estimated to be worth approximately US$57 billion

In 2007, the United States Environmental Protection Agency (EPA) stated that more than 63 million computers in the U.S. were traded in for replacements or discarded. Today, 15% of electronic devices and equipment are recycled in the United States. Most electronic waste is sent to landfills or incinerated, which releases materials such as lead, mercury, or cadmium into the soil, groundwater, and atmosphere, thus having a negative impact on the environment.

Many materials used in computer hardware can be recovered by recycling for future production. The reuse of tin, silicon, iron, aluminium, and a variety of plastics that are present in bulk in computers or other electronics can reduce the costs of constructing new systems. Components frequently contain copper, gold, tantalum, silver, platinum, palladium, and lead as well as other valuable materials suitable for reclamation.

Computer hardware contains many toxic substances, like dioxins, polychlorinated biphenyls (PCBs), cadmium, chromium, radioactive isotopes, and mercury. A typical computer monitor may contain more than 6% lead by weight, much of which is in the lead glass of the cathode-ray tube (CRT). A typical 15-inch (38 cm) computer monitor may contain 1.5 pounds (1 kg) of lead, but other monitors have been estimated to have up to 8 pounds (4 kg) of lead. Circuit boards contain considerable quantities of lead-tin solders that are more likely to leach into groundwater or create air pollution due to incineration. In US landfills, about 40% of the lead content levels are from e-waste. The processing (e.g., incineration and acid treatments) required to reclaim these precious substances may release, generate, or synthesize toxic byproducts.

Export of waste to countries with lower environmental standards is a major concern. The Basel Convention includes hazardous wastes such as, but not limited to, CRT screens as an item that may not be exported transcontinentally without the prior consent of both the country exporting and receiving the waste. Companies may find it cost-effective in the short term to sell outdated computers to less developed countries with lax regulations. It is commonly believed that a majority of surplus laptops are routed to developing nations. The high value of working and reusable laptops, computers, and components (e.g., RAM) can help pay the cost of transportation for many worthless commodities. Laws governing the exportation of waste electronics are put in place to govern recycling companies in developed countries, which ship waste to Third World countries. However, concerns about the impact of e-recycling on human health, the health of recycling workers, and environmental degradation remain. For example, due to the lack of strict regulations in developing countries, sometimes workers smash old products, propelling toxins onto the ground, contaminating the soil, and putting those who do not wear shoes in danger. Other procedures include burning away wire insulation and acid baths to resell circuit boards. These methods pose environmental and health hazards, as toxins are released into the air and acid bath residue can enter the water supply.

== Regulations ==
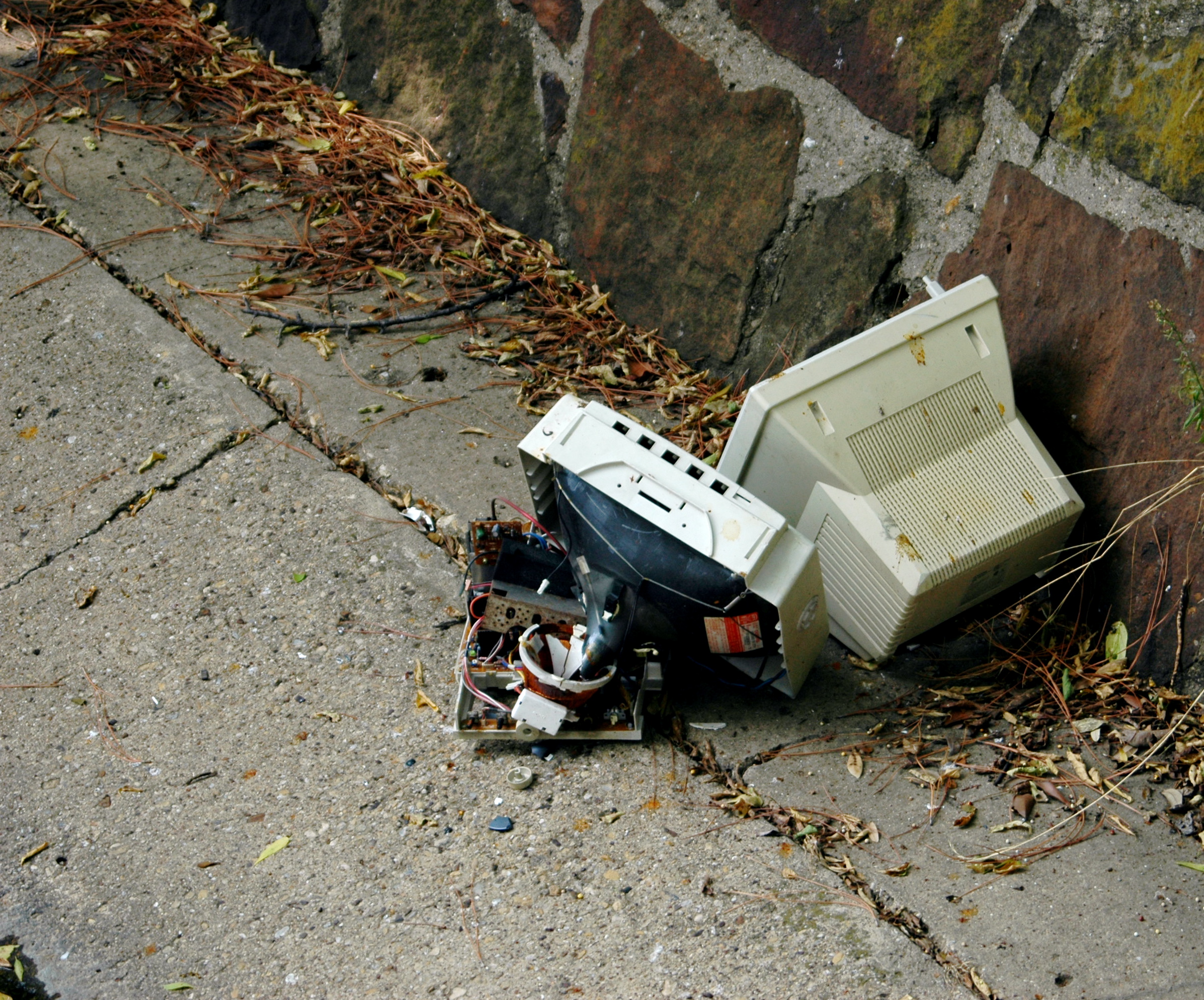
An abandoned monitor

=== Europe ===
In Switzerland, the first electronic waste recycling system was implemented in 1991, beginning with collection of old refrigerators; over the years, all other electric and electronic devices were gradually added to the system. The established producer responsibility organization is SWICO, mainly handling information, communication, and organization technology. The European Union implemented a similar system in February 2003, under the Waste Electrical and Electronic Equipment Directive (WEEE Directive, 2002/96/EC).

Pan-European adoption of the legislation was slow on take-up, with Italy and the United Kingdom being the final member states to pass it into law. The success of the WEEE directive has varied significantly from state to state, with collection rates varying between 13 kilograms per capita per annum to as little as 1 kg per capita per annum. Computers & electronic waste collected from households within Europe are treated under the WEEE directive via Producer Compliance Schemes (whereby manufacturers of electronics pay into a scheme that funds its recovery from household waste recycling centres (HWRCs) and nominated waste treatment facilities (known as Obligated WEEE).

However, recycling of ex-corporate computer hardware and associated electronic equipment falls outside the Producer Compliance Scheme (known as non-obligated). In the UK, waste or obsolete corporate-related computer hardware is treated via third-party authorized treatment facilities, which normally impose a charge for its collection and treatment.

Since mid-2020, the classification of WEEE has changed with regard to POPs (persistent organic pollutants). In the UK, WEEE containing POPs is now classified as a hazardous waste, which includes printed circuit boards, cable from WEEE, and categories 1,2,3,6,7 (cat 4 and 5 unless evidence provided to the contrary).

=== United States ===
==== Federal ====
The United States Congress considers several electronic waste bills, like the National Computer Recycling Act introduced by Congressman Mike Thompson (D-CA). The main federal law governing solid waste is the Resource Conservation and Recovery Act of 1976. It covers only CRTs, though state regulations may differ. There are also separate laws concerning battery disposal. On March 25, 2009, the House Science and Technology Committee approved funding for research on reducing electronic waste and mitigating environmental impact, regarded by sponsor Ralph Hall (R-TX) as the first federal bill to directly address electronic waste. The Electronic Device Recycling Research and Development Act was passed in April 2009 to distribute grants to universities, government labs, and private industries for research in developing projects in line with e-waste recycling and refurbishment.

==== State ====
Many states have introduced legislation concerning the recycling and reuse of computers or computer parts, or other electronics. Most American computer recycling legislations address it from within the larger electronic waste issue.

In 2001, Arkansas enacted the Arkansas Computer and Electronic Solid Waste Management Act, which requires that state agencies manage and sell surplus computer equipment, establishes a computer and electronics recycling fund, and authorizes the Division of Environmental Quality, a subset of the Arkansas Department of Energy and Environment, to regulate and/or ban the disposal of computer and electronic equipment in Arkansas landfills.

In 2003, California passed the Electronic Waste Recycling Act (EWRA), which established California's system for managing e-waste. It mandated electronics manufacturers to submit an annual report detailing efforts to reduce hazardous substances. It required fees, based on screen sizes, to be paid during sales of covered electronic devices and added restrictions on hazardous materials like lead and mercury in electronic devices. The program is scheduled to expand in 2026 to include battery-embedded products. All fees paid are proceeds towards environmentally responsible recycling and disposal of electronic devices in California.

In 2010, the New York State Electronic Equipment Recycling and Reuse Act was signed into law, mandating electronics manufacturers to disclose the levels of regulated materials, like lead, in products to ensure they remain within legal limits. It also required anyone responsible for collecting electronic waste to report details concerning the consumers that provided the waste, as well as the manner in which they disposed of this waste, ensuring compliance with previous regulations. The New York State Department of Environmental Conservation is responsible for overseeing these regulations, collection sites, and ensuring overall compliance with environmental laws.

=== Canada ===
Canada has implemented various electronic waste (e-waste) recycling regulations, primarily at the provincial level. The Electronic Products Recycling Association (EPRA) oversees e-waste recycling programs nationwide. Additionally, the federal government has introduced the Canadian right-to-repair legislation, which is pending approval.

In Ontario, the Electrical and Electronic Equipment (EEE) Regulation (O. Reg. 522/20) mandates producers to establish systems for the collection and proper disposal of electronic products. Producers of information technology, telecommunications, and audio-visual (ITT/AV) equipment were required to register by November 30, 2020, with collection and management obligations commencing on January 1, 2021.

In Quebec, the "Regulation respecting the recovery and reclamation of products by enterprises" (Q-2, r. 40.1) governs the recycling of electronic waste (e-waste). This regulation requires companies to collect and recycle the electronic products they sell, encouraging the development of ecologically sustainable products.

The Electronic Products Recycling Association of Québec (EPRA-Québec), an industry-led, not-for-profit organization, manages the province's e-waste recycling program. Residents can drop off their unwanted electronics free of charge at EPRA-Québec authorized collection points. The program funds itself through Environmental Handling Fees (EHF) applied to new electronic products sold in Quebec.

Similarly, British Columbia has adopted extended producer responsibility (EPR) programs under its Recycling Regulation, requiring manufacturers to manage the collection and recycling of electronic waste.

=== Asia ===
In Japan, sellers and manufacturers of certain electronics (such as televisions and air conditioners) are required to recycle them. This is covered by at least two legislations: the Law for the Promotion of Effective Utilization of Resources (LPUR) and the Law for the Recycling of Specified Kinds of Home Appliances (LRHA). The former, which was passed in 2001, encouraged manufacturers to voluntarily help recycle goods, while the LRHA, which was adopted in 2009, required more recycling efforts by consumers and manufacturers of home appliances. However, no legislation exists to cover the recycling of computer or cellphone-related waste.

It is required in South Korea and Taiwan that sellers and manufacturers of electronics be responsible for recycling 75% of their used products. In South Korea, some local governments have introduced recycling initiatives, such as the case of Seoul, which launched its specialized e-waste recycling program. This includes the SR Center recycling facility, which takes apart and salvages materials from a fifth of the 10-ton e-waste that the city generates each year.

According to a report by UNEP titled, "Recycling – from E-Waste to Resources," the amount of e-waste produced – including mobile phones and computers – could rise by as much as 500 percent over the next decade in some countries, such as India.

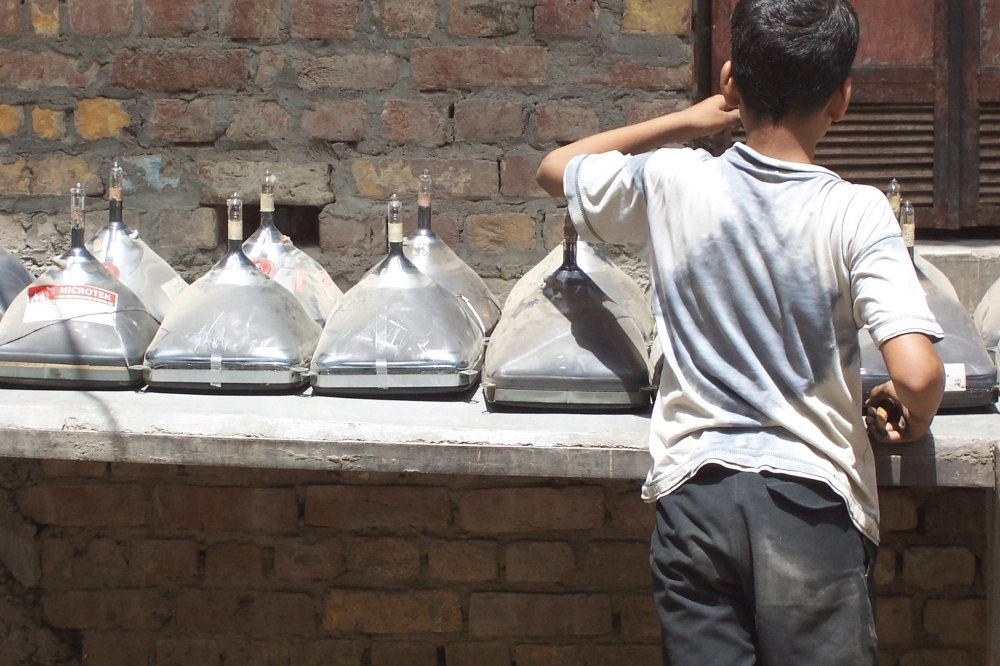
Electronic waste is often exported to developing countries.

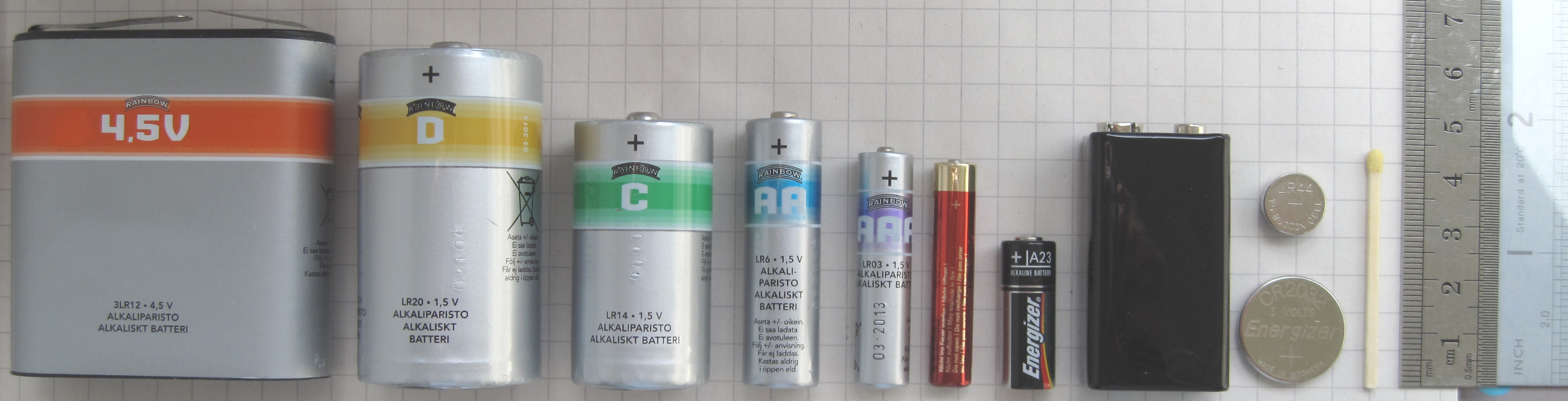
4.5-volt, D, C, AA, AAA, AAAA, A23, 9-volt, CR2032 and LR44 cells are all recyclable in most countries.

One theory is that increased regulation of electronic waste and concern over the environmental harm in mature economies creates an economic disincentive to remove residues prior to export. Critics of trade in used electronics maintain that it is too easy for brokers calling themselves recyclers to export unscreened electronic waste to developing countries, such as China, India and parts of Africa, thus avoiding the expense of removing items like bad cathode-ray tubes (the processing of which is expensive and difficult). The developing countries are becoming big dump yards of e-waste. Proponents of international trade point to the success of fair trade programs in other industries, where cooperation has led creation of sustainable jobs, and can bring affordable technology in countries where repair and reuse rates are higher.

Organizations like A2Z Group have stepped in to take up the responsibility to collect and recycle e-waste at various locations in India.

In China, several key regulations have been implemented to manage electronic waste.

In November 2004, the National Development and Reform Commission (NDRC) established the Management of Recycling Home Appliances and Electronic Equipment policy to improve the recovery of valuable materials in discarded electronic devices, like gold, silver, and copper, reducing the need to extract new raw materials from the earth.

In March 2007, the Ministry of Industry and Information Technology (MIIT), National Development and Reform Commission, the Ministry of Commerce, and multiple other government agencies introduced the Management Methods for Pollution Control of IT Products to regulate hazardous substances in electronic products. It mandated manufacturers of electronics to minimize the use of hazardous materials in products and to label their toxic components. It required electronic products imported from other countries to also abide by national standards. These government agencies oversee implementation, imposing penalties such as fines for non-compliance.

In Singapore, the Environmental Public Health Act (EPHA) was amended in April 2014 to introduce the Mandatory Waste Reporting scheme (MWR). This required, upon written notice from the National Environment Agency, to report annual waste data and submit waste reduction plans. The MWR was introduced to focus management attention on waste volumes. Affected premises were to report via the Waste and Resource Management System (WRMS), detailing waste disposal, recycling quantities, and progress on reduction initiatives. They were also required to keep waste disposal records for at least five years. The National Environment Agency provided guidelines, training, and practices for hotels, malls, and industrial developments to support waste management efforts.

=== South Africa ===
South Africa's environmental protection is covered by the National Environmental Management Act (1998) and the National Environmental Management: Waste Act (2008).

The National Environmental Management Act of 1998 established the National Environmental Advisory Forum to advise the Minister of Forestry, Fisheries, and the Environment on matters pertaining to the sustainability of the environment in South Africa. The act aims to integrate environmental management into all development activities, ensuring sustainability while progressing the economy and protecting natural resources.

The National Environmental Management: Waste Act of 2008 was established to regulate waste management in South Africa by setting standards and frameworks for responsible waste disposal and reduction. The act aims to minimize the environmental impact of waste by promoting recycling, recovery, and sustainable waste management practices while supporting economic growth and protecting natural resources.

Under the act, penalties for violations vary based on the severity of the offence. For severe offences, violations such as illegal waste disposal or causing significant environmental harm could result in a fine of up to R10 million, imprisonment for up to 10 years, or both. Less severe offences carry penalties of up to R5 million in fines, imprisonment for up to five years, or both. Minor and continuing offences may result in fines for up to R1,000 per day and imprisonment for a duration ranging from 20 days to six months.

== Recycling methods ==
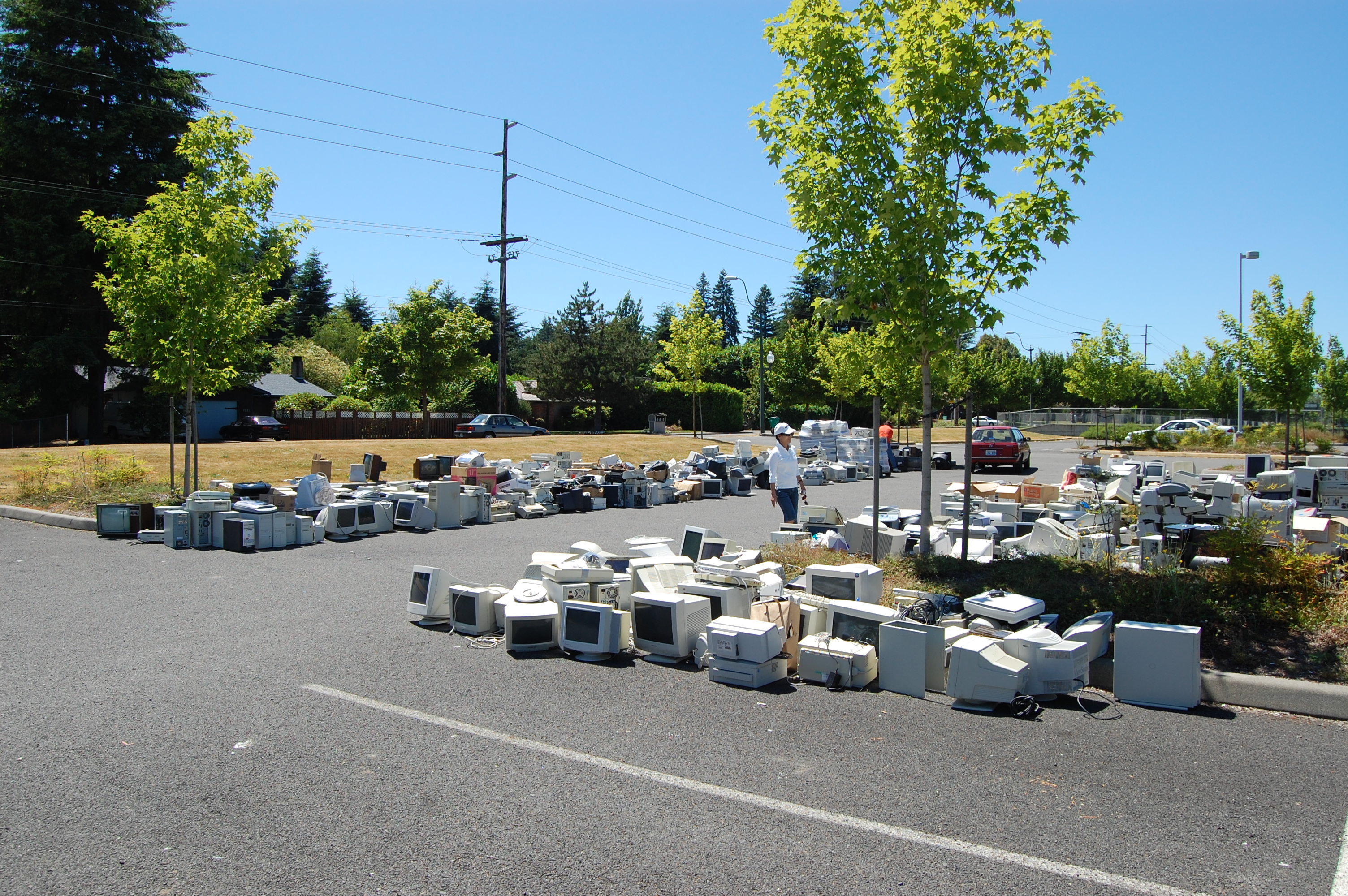
Computers being collected for recycling at a pickup event in Olympia, Washington, United States

=== Consumer recycling ===
Consumer recycling options consist of (see below) selling, donating computers directly to organizations in need, sending devices directly back to their original manufacturers, or getting components to a convenient recycler or refurbisher.

=== Scrapping recycling ===
In the recycling process, TVs, monitors, mobile phones, and computers may be tested for reuse and repaired. If broken, they may be disassembled for parts, still having high value if labour is cheap enough. Other e-waste is shredded to roughly 100 mm pieces and manually checked to separate toxic batteries and capacitors, which contain poisonous metals. The remaining pieces are further shredded to ~10 mm and passed under a magnet to remove ferrous metals. An eddy current ejects non-ferrous metals, which are sorted by density either by a centrifuge or vibrating plates. Precious metals can be dissolved in acid, sorted, and smelted into ingots. The remaining glass and plastic fractions are separated by density and sold to re-processors. TVs and monitors must be manually disassembled to remove either toxic lead in CRTs or the mercury in flat screens.

A 2024 review identified photochemical, thermochemical, mechanochemical, electrochemical, and sonochemical processes as approaches used in electronic waste recycling. These processes can be applied to metal recovery, polymer decomposition, and pollutant removal.

Corporations face risks both for incompletely destroyed data and for improperly disposed of computers. In the UK, some recycling companies use a specialized WEEE-registered contractor to dispose of IT equipment and electrical appliances. In America, under the Resource Conservation and Recovery Act, companies are liable for compliance with regulations even if the recycling process is outsourced. Companies can mitigate these risks by requiring waivers of liability, audit trails, certificates of data destruction, signed confidentiality agreements, and random audits of information security. The National Association of Information Destruction is an international trade association for data destruction providers. Life-cycle assessment (LCA) has been used to compare the environmental impacts of formal e-waste recycling pathways. A 2024 review found substantial variation in how these studies assess recycling systems, which can lead to different results. The review also found that LCA can identify environmental hotspots, particularly in metal recovery, but noted that data requirements and methodological choices contribute to uncertainty and called for more uncertainty analysis.

=== Sale ===
Online auctions are an alternative for consumers willing to resell for cash with fewer fees, in a complicated, self-managed, competitive environment where paid listings might not sell. Online classified ads can be similarly risky due to forgery scams and uncertainty.

=== Take back ===
When researching computer companies before a computer purchase, consumers can find out if they offer recycling services. Most major computer manufacturers offer some form of recycling. At the user's request, they may mail in their old computers or arrange for pickup from the manufacturer.

Hewlett-Packard also offers free recycling, but only one of its "national" recycling programs is available nationally, rather than in one or two specific states. Hewlett-Packard also offers to pick up any computer product of any brand for a fee, and to offer a coupon against the purchase of future computers or components; it was the largest computer recycler in America in 2003, and it has recycled over 750,000,000 pounds (340,000,000 kg) of electronic waste globally since 1995. It encourages the shared approach of collection points for consumers and recyclers to meet.

=== Exchange ===
Manufacturers often offer a free replacement service when purchasing a new PC. For example, Dell Computers and Apple Inc. may take back old products when one buys a new one. Both refurbish and resell their computers with a one-year warranty.

Many companies purchase and recycle all brands of working and broken laptops and notebook computers from individuals and corporations. Building a market for recycling desktop computers has proven more difficult than exchange programs for laptops, smartphones, and other smaller electronics. A basic business model is to provide a seller with an instant online quote based on laptop characteristics, then to send a shipping label and prepaid box to the seller, to erase, reformat, and process the laptop, and to pay rapidly by cheque. A majority of these companies are also generalized electronic waste recyclers as well; organizations that recycle computers exclusively include Cash For Laptops, a laptop refurbisher in Nevada that claims to be the first to buy laptops online in 2001.

=== Donations/nonprofits ===
With the constantly rising costs due to inflation, many families or schools do not have sufficient funds available for computers to be used along with education standards. Families also impacted by disaster suffer as well due to the financial impact of the situation they have incurred. Many nonprofit organizations, such as InterConnection.org, can be found locally as well as around the web and give detailed descriptions as to what methods are used for dissemination and detailed instructions on how to donate. The impact can be seen locally and globally, affecting thousands in need. In Canada non profit organizations engaged in computer recycling, such as The Electronic Recycling Association Calgary, Edmonton, Vancouver, Winnipeg, Toronto, Montreal, Computers for Schools Canada wide, are very active in collecting and refurbishing computers and laptops to help the non-profit and charitable sectors and schools.

=== Junkyard Computing ===
The term junkyard computing is a colloquial expression for using old or inferior hardware to fulfill computational tasks while handling reliability and availability on the software level. It uses abstraction of computational resources via software, allowing hardware replacement with very low effort. Ease of replacement is hereby a corner point since hardware failures are expected at any time due to the condition of the underlying infrastructure. This paradigm became more widely used with the introduction of cluster orchestration software like Kubernetes or Apache Mesos, since large monolithic applications require reliability and availability on the machine level, whereas this kind of software is fault-tolerant by design. Those orchestration tools also introduced fairly fast set-up processes, allowing to use junkyard computing economically and even making this pattern applicable in the first place. Further use cases were introduced when continuous delivery was getting more widely accepted. Infrastructure to execute tests and static code analysis was needed, which requires as much performance as possible while being extremely cost-effective. From an economic and technological perspective, junkyard computing is only practicable for a small number of users or companies. It already requires a decent number of physical machines to compensate for hardware failures while maintaining the required reliability and availability. This implies a direct need for a matching underlying infrastructure to house all the computers and servers. Scaling this paradigm is also quite limited due to the increasing importance of factors like power efficiency and maintenance efforts, making this kind of computing perfect for mid-sized applications.

== Health and Environmental Impacts of Informal Recycling ==
While e-waste recycling is essential for recovering valuable materials, it poses serious environmental and health risks when handled improperly. Toxic substances such as lead, mercury, and cadmium can be released through unsafe methods. In particular, burning e-waste emits hazardous chemicals like dioxins, furans, polycyclic aromatic hydrocarbons (PAHs), persistent halogenated aromatic hydrocarbons (PHAHs), and hydrogen chloride, which contaminate air, water, soil, and surrounding ecosystems.

In many developing countries, informal recycling practices—such as manual dismantling, open burning, and crude plastic processing—release toxic metals, including arsenic, manganese, nickel, lead, and zinc, along with organic pollutants like flame retardants, PCBs, and dioxins. Workers exposed to these substances face severe health risks, including respiratory problems and cancer. Heavy metal contamination has been documented in soil and airborne particles surrounding informal e-waste recycling facilities. In Pakistan, an assessment of 40 informal recycling sites across nine cities found significantly higher concentrations of heavy metals near recycling facilities compared with a background site. Exposure can occur through ingestion of contaminated soil, inhalation of airborne particles, and direct contact with contaminated surfaces. Prolonged exposure to these heavy metals can pose serious health risks not just to recycling workers but also nearby residents.

Improper recycling also leads to soil and water contamination as hazardous metals leach into the environment, degrading water quality and soil health. Techniques like acid leaching and dismantling emit persistent toxins such as PCBs and dioxins that accumulate over time, posing lasting ecological and health threats.

Moreover, many informal methods are inefficient, recovering fewer materials and causing greater environmental damage. Improperly processed e-waste often becomes non-recyclable, compounding the waste problem. Some techniques are also energy-intensive, offsetting the environmental gains of recycling. Without stronger regulations and safer recycling systems, the environmental costs of current practices may surpass their economic benefits, highlighting the urgent need for more sustainable approaches.

== History ==
Although consumer electronics such as the radio have been popular since the 1920s, recycling was almost unheard of until the early 1990s. At the end of the 1970s, the accelerating pace of domestic consumer electronics drastically shortened the lifespan of electronics such as TVs, VCRs and audio. New innovations appeared more quickly, making older equipment obsolete. Increased complexity and sophistication of manufacture made local repair more difficult. The retail market shifted gradually, but substantially, from a few high-value items that were cherished for years and repaired when necessary, to short-lived items that were rapidly replaced owing to wear or simply fashion, and discarded rather than repaired. This was particularly evident in computing, highlighted by Moore's Law. In 1988, two severe incidents highlighted the approaching e-waste crisis. The cargo barge Khian Sea was loaded with more than 14,000 tons of toxic ash from Pennsylvania, which had been refused acceptance in New Jersey and the Caribbean. After sailing for 16 months, all the waste was dumped as "topsoil fertiliser" in Haiti and in the Bay of Bengal by November 1988. In June 1988, a large illegal toxic waste dump, which had been created by an Italian company, was discovered. This led to the formation of the Basel Convention to stem the flow of poisonous substances from developed countries in 1989.

In 1991, the first electronic waste recycling system was implemented in Switzerland, beginning with collection of old refrigerators but gradually expanding to cover all devices. The organisation SWICO handles the programme, and is a partnership between IT retailers.

The first publication to report the recycling of computers and electronic waste was published on the front page of the New York Times on April 14, 1993, by columnist Steve Lohr. It detailed the work of Advanced Recovery Inc., a small recycler, in trying to safely dismantle computers, even if most waste was landfilled. Several other companies emerged in the early 1990s, chiefly in Europe, where national 'take back' laws compelled retailers to use them.

After these schemes were set up, many countries could not deal with the sheer quantity of e-waste they generated or its hazardous nature. They began to export the problem to developing countries without enforced environmental legislation. This is cheaper: the cost of recycling computer monitors in the US is ten times more than in China. Demand in Asia for electronic waste began to grow when scrap yards found they could extract valuable substances such as copper, iron, silicon, nickel, and gold during the recycling process.

The Waste Electrical and Electronic Equipment Directive (WEEE Directive) became European Law in February 2003 and covers all aspects of recycling all types of appliances. This was followed by the Electronic Waste Recycling Act, enshrined in California law in January 2005

The 2000s saw a large increase in both the sale of electronic devices and their growth as a waste stream: in 2002, e-waste grew faster than any other type of waste in the EU. This caused investment in modern, automated facilities to cope with the influx of redundant appliances.

=== E-cycling ===
E-cycling or "E-waste" is an initiative by the United States Environmental Protection Agency (EPA) which refers to donations, reuse, shredding and general collection of used electronics. Generically, the term refers to the process of collecting, brokering, disassembling, repairing and recycling the components or metals contained in used or discarded electronic equipment, otherwise known as electronic waste (e-waste). "E-cyclable" items include, but are not limited to: televisions, computers, microwave ovens, vacuum cleaners, telephones and cellular phones, stereos, and VCRs and DVDs, just about anything that has a cord, light, or takes some kind of battery.

Investment in e-cycling facilities has been increasing recently due to technology's rapid rate of obsolescence, concern over improper methods, and opportunities for manufacturers to influence the secondary market (used and reused products). Higher metal prices can result in more recycling taking place. The controversy around methods stems from a lack of agreement over preferred outcomes.

World markets with lower disposable incomes consider 75% repair and reuse to be valuable enough to justify 25% disposal. Debate and certification standards may be leading to better definitions, though civil law contracts, governing the expected process, are still vital to any contracted process, as poorly defined as "e-cycling".

==== Pros of e-cycling ====
The e-waste disposal occurring after processing for reuse, repair of equipment, and recovery of metals may be unethical or illegal when e-scrap of many kinds is transported overseas to developing countries for such processing. It is transported as if to be repaired and/or recycled, but after processing the less valuable e-scrap becomes e-waste/pollution there. Another point of view is that the net environmental cost must be compared to and include the mining, refining and extraction with its waste and pollution cost of new products manufactured to replace secondary products, which are routinely destroyed in wealthier nations, and which cannot economically be repaired in older or obsolete products.

As an example of negative impacts of e-waste, pollution of groundwater has become so serious in areas surrounding China's landfills that water must be shipped in from 18 miles (29 km) away. However, mining of new metals can have even broader impacts on groundwater. Either thorough e-cycling processing, domestic processing or overseas repair, can help the environment by avoiding pollution. Such e-cycling can theoretically be a sustainable alternative to disposing of e-waste in landfills. In addition, e-cycling allows for the reclamation of potential conflict minerals, like gold and wolframite, which requires less of those to be mined and lessens the potential money flow to militias and other exploitative actors in third-world that profit from mining them.

Supporters of one form of "required e-cycling" legislation argue that e-cycling saves taxpayers money, as the financial responsibility would be shifted from the taxpayer to the manufacturers. Advocates of more simple legislation (such as landfill bans for e-waste) argue that involving manufacturers does not reduce the cost to consumers, if reuse value is lost, and the resulting costs are then passed on to consumers in new products, particularly affecting markets which can hardly afford new products. It is theorized that manufacturers who take part in e-cycling would be motivated to use fewer materials in the production process, create longer lasting products, and implement safer, more efficient recycling systems. This theory is sharply disputed and has never been demonstrated.

==== Criticisms of e-cycling ====
According to the Reason Foundation, e-cycling only raises the product and waste management costs of e-waste for consumers and limits innovation on the part of high-tech companies. They also believe that e-cycling facilities could unintentionally cause great harm to the environment. Critics claim that e-waste doesn't occupy a significant portion of total waste.

Another opposition to e-cycling is that many problems are posed in disassembly: the process is costly and dangerous because of the heavy metals of which the electronic products are composed, and as little as 1–5% of the original cost of materials can be retrieved. A final problem that people find is that identity fraud is all too common in regards to the disposal of electronic products. As the programs are legislated, creating winners and losers among e-cyclers with different locations and processes, it may be difficult to distinguish between criticism of e-cycling as a practice, and criticism of the specific legislated means proposed to enhance it.

==== The fate of e-waste ====
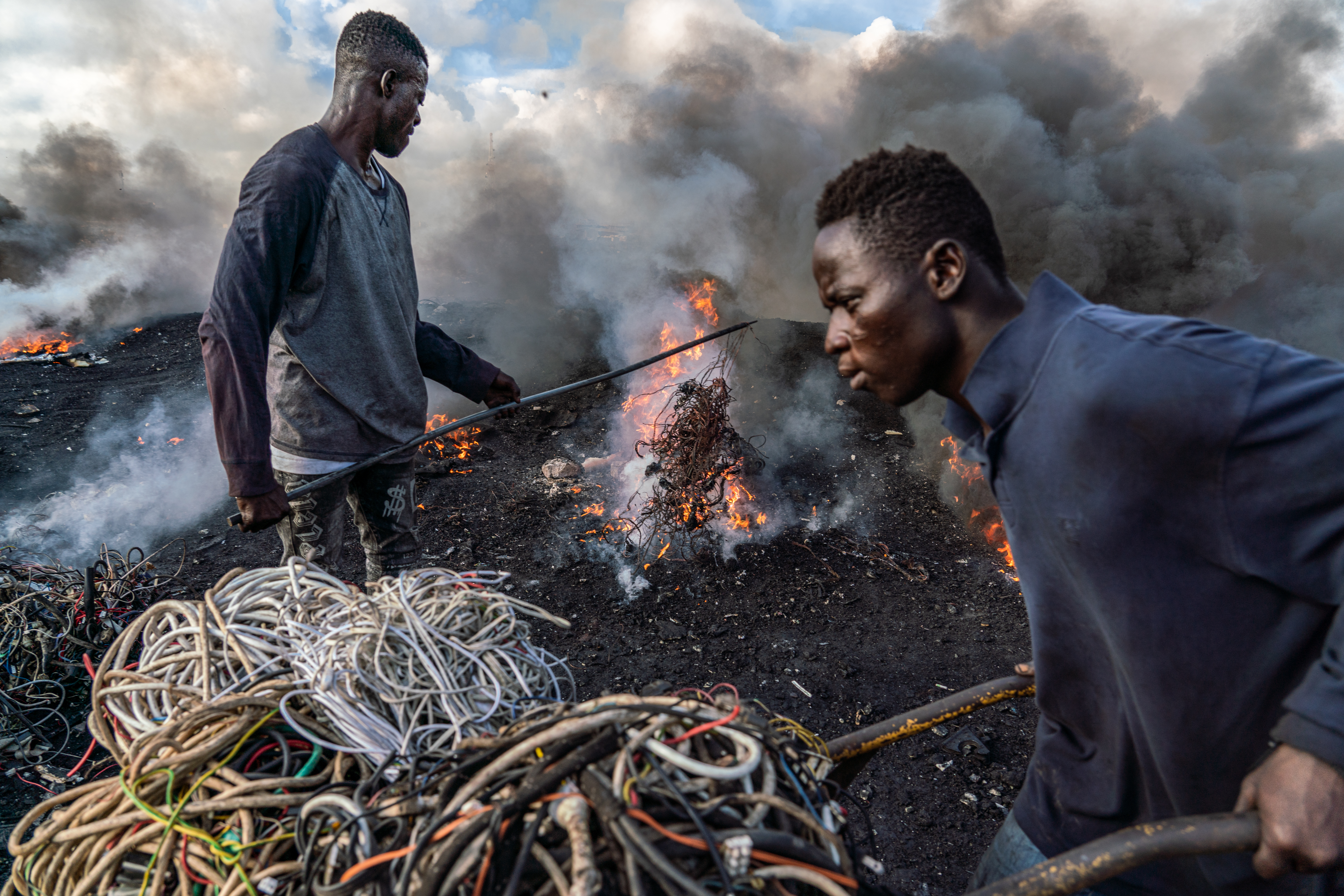
Workers recovering metals from e-waste in Agbogbloshie, an e-waste recovery site in Ghana. Exported e-waste is frequently processed in situations that are unhealthy for the workers, where they are exposed to toxics.

A hefty criticism often lobbed at reuse based recyclers is that people think that they are recycling their electronic waste, when in reality it is actually being exported to developing countries like China, India, and Nigeria. For instance, at free recycling drives, "recyclers" may not be staying true to their word, but selling e-waste overseas or to parts brokers. Studies indicate that 50–80% of the 300,000 to 400,000 tons (270,000 to 360,000 tonnes) of e-waste is being sent overseas, and that approximately 2 million tons (1.8 million tonnes) per year go to U.S. landfills.

Although not possible in all circumstances, the best way to e-cycle is to upcycle e-waste. On the other hand, the electronic products in question are generally manufactured, and repaired under warranty, in the same nations, which anti-reuse recyclers depict as primitive. Reuse-based e-recyclers believe that fair-trade incentives for export markets will lead to better results than domestic shredding. There has been a continued debate between export-friendly e-cycling and increased regulation of that practice.

In the European Union, debate regarding the export of e-waste has resulted in a significant amendment to the WEEE directive (January 2012) with a view to significantly diminishing the export of WEEE (untreated e-waste). During debate in Strasburg, MEPs stated that "53 million tonnes of WEEE were generated in 2009 but only 18% collected for recycling" with the remainder being exported or sent to landfill. The Amendment, voted through by a unanimous 95% of representatives, removed the re-use (repair and refurbishment) aspect of the directive and placed more emphasis upon recycling and recovery of precious metals and base metals. The changes went further by placing the burden upon registered exporters to prove that used equipment leaving Europe was "fit for purpose".

==== Policy issues and current efforts ====
Currently, pieces of government legislation and a number of grassroots efforts have contributed to the growth of e-cycling processes which emphasize decreased exports over increased reuse rates. The Electronic Waste Recycling Act was passed in California in 2003. It requires that consumers pay an extra fee for certain types of electronics, and the collected money be then redistributed to recycling companies that are qualified to properly recycle these products. It is the only state that legislates against e-waste through this kind of consumer fee; the other states' efforts focus on producer responsibility laws or waste disposal bans. No study has shown that per capita recovery is greater in one type of legislated program (e.g. California) versus ordinary waste disposal bans (e.g. Massachusetts), though recovery has greatly increased in states which use either method.

As of September, 2006, Dell developed the nation's first completely free recycling program, furthering the responsibilities that manufacturers are taking for e-cycling. Manufacturers and retailers such as Best Buy, Sony, and Samsung have also set up recycling programs. This program does not accept televisions, which are the most expensive used electronic item, and are unpopular in markets which must deal with televisions when the more valuable computers have been cherry picked.

Another step being taken is the recyclers' pledge of true stewardship, sponsored by the Computer TakeBack Campaign. It has been signed by numerous recyclers promising to recycle responsibly. Grassroots efforts have also played a big part in this issue, as they and other community organizations are being formed to help responsibly recycle e-waste. Other grassroots campaigns are Basel, the Computer TakeBack Campaign (co-coordinated by the Grassroots Recycling Network), and the Silicon Valley Toxics Coalition. No study has shown any difference in recycling methods under the Pledge, and no data is available to demonstrate difference in management between "Pledge" and non-Pledge companies, though it is assumed that the risk of making false claims will prevent Pledge companies from wrongly describing their processes.

Many people believe that the U.S. should follow the European Union model in regards to its management of e-waste, such as the Extended Producer Responsibility, which was started in Sweden in 1990. In this program, a directive forces manufacturers to take responsibility for e-cycling; it also demands manufacturers' mandatory take-back and places bans on exporting e-waste to developing countries. British Columbia has more than 20 EPR programs under the Recycling Regulation legislation, which stops e-waste from being put into landfills and recycles them instead. There are more than 80 programs in Canada as of 2013.

Another longer-term solution is for computers to be composed of less dangerous products and many people disagree. No data has been provided to show that people who agree with the European model have based their agreement on measured outcomes or experience-based scientific method.

== Data security ==
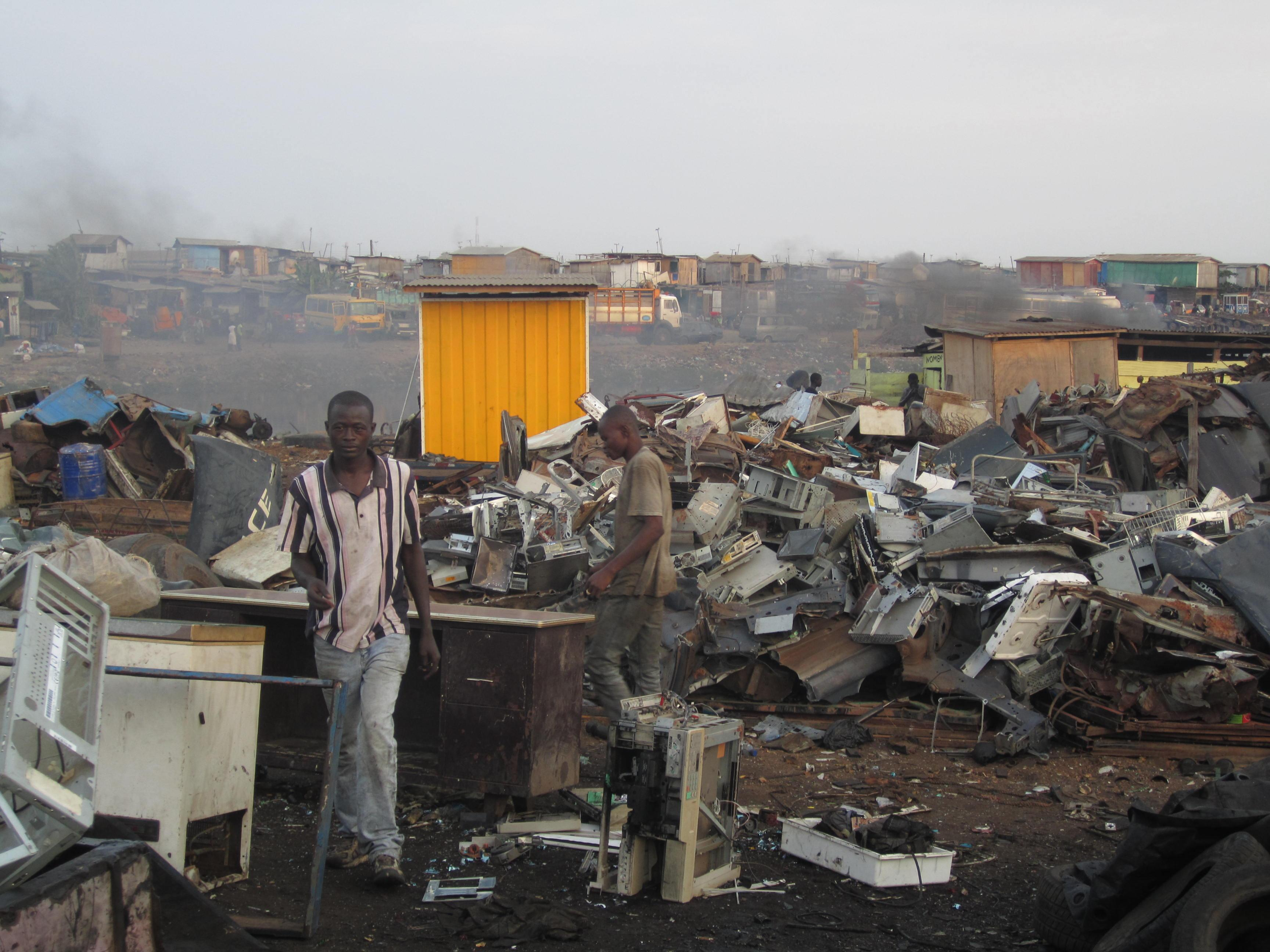
Electronic waste dump at Agbogbloshie, Ghana. Organized criminals commonly search the drives for information to use in local scams.

E-waste presents a potential security threat to individuals and exporting countries. Hard drives that are not properly erased before the computer is disposed of can be reopened, exposing sensitive information. Credit card numbers, private financial data, account information and records of online transactions can be accessed by most willing individuals. Organized criminals in Ghana commonly search the drives for information to use in local scams.

Government contracts have been discovered on hard drives found in Agbogbloshie, Ghana. Multimillion-dollar agreements from United States security institutions such as the Defense Intelligence Agency (DIA), the Transportation Security Administration and Homeland Security have all resurfaced in Agbogbloshie.

=== Reasons to destroy and recycle securely ===
There are ways to ensure that not only hardware is destroyed but also the private data on the hard drive. Having customer data stolen, lost, or misplaced contributes to the ever-growing number of people who are affected by identity theft, which can cause corporations to lose more than just money. The image of a company that holds secure data, such as banks, law firms, pharmaceuticals, and credit corporations is also at risk. If a company's public image is hurt, it could cause consumers to not use their services and could cost millions in business losses and positive public relation campaigns. The cost of data breaches "varies widely, ranging from $90 to $50,000 (under HIPAA's new HITECH amendment, that came about through the American Recovery and Revitalization act of 2009), as per customer record, depending on whether the breach is "low-profile" or "high-profile" and the company is in a non-regulated or highly regulated area, such as banking or medical institutions."

There is also a major backlash from the consumer if there is a data breach in a company that is supposed to be trusted to protect their private information. If an organization has any consumer info on file, they must by law (Red Flags Clarification act of 2010) have written information protection policies and procedures in place, that serve to combat, mitigate, and detect vulnerable areas that could result in identity theft. The United States Department of Defense has published a standard to which recyclers and individuals may meet in order to satisfy HIPAA requirements.

=== Secure recycling ===
Countries have developed standards, aimed at businesses and with the purpose of ensuring the security of Data contained in 'confidential' computer media [NIST 800–88: US standard for Data Remanence][HMG CESG IS5, Baseline & Enhanced, UK Government Protocol for Data Destruction]. National Association for Information Destruction (NAID) "is the international trade association for companies providing information destruction services. Suppliers of products, equipment and services to destruction companies are also eligible for membership. NAID's mission is to promote the information destruction industry and the standards and ethics of its member companies." There are companies that follow the guidelines from NAID and also meet all Federal EPA and local DEP regulations.

The typical process for computer recycling aims to securely destroy hard drives while still recycling the byproduct. A typical process for effective computer recycling:

1. Receive hardware for destruction in locked and securely transported vehicles.
2. Shred hard drives.
3. Separate all aluminum from the waste metals with an electromagnet.
4. Collect and securely deliver the shredded remains to an aluminum recycling plant.
5. Mold the remaining hard drive parts into aluminum ingots.

The Asset Disposal and Information Security Alliance (ADISA) publishes an ADISA IT Asset Disposal Security Standard that covers all phases of the e-waste disposal process from collection to transportation, storage and sanitization's at the disposal facility. It also conducts periodic audits of disposal vendors.

== See also ==
- Appliance recycling
- Mobile phone recycling
- RULE Project
