= Thomas Lindhqvist =

Swedish academic (born 1954)

Thomas Lindhqvist (born 4 February 1954) is a Swedish academic. He is credited for introducing the concept of extended producer responsibility. He is currently associate professor and director of research programs at the International Institute for Industrial Environmental Economics at Lund University in Sweden

Thomas teaches and researches mainly in the area of environmental product policy, with special emphasis on extended producer responsibility and informative instruments (environmental product declarations and eco-labelling), as well as preventive environmental strategies, the use of economic instruments and waste management. Thomas has been a co-leader of the Working Group on Policies, Strategies and Instruments to Promote Cleaner Production, part of the UNEP Network on Cleaner Production. He has also worked on research projects with several national and international authorities and organizations, a few being the Swedish Environmental Protection Agency, the Swedish Ministry of Environment, the Nordic Council of Ministers, the OECD, WWF and Greenpeace.

== Education ==
He received his PhD (Industrial Environmental Economics) in 2000 from Lund University. He was awarded his MSc (Engineering Physics) in 1990 and BA degrees in 1982 in Business Administration and Russian, Polish and Arabic.

== Selected publications ==
Mont, O, & Lindhqvist, T. (2003). The role of public policy in advancement of product service systems. Journal of Cleaner Production, accepted for publication.

Lindhqvist, T, & Mont, O. (2002). Funktionsperspektiv på varor och tjänster [A functional perspective on products and services]. Rapport 5227. Naturvårdsverkets förlag: Stockholm.

Emtairah, T, Jacobsson, N, Kogg, B, Lindhqvist, T, Lissinger, J, & Mont, O. (2002). Av vem skapas marknaden för miljöanpassade produkter? [Who creates the market for environmentally conscious products?]. Naturvårdsverket: Stockholm.

Lifset, R, & Lindhqvist, T. (2001). Trust but Verify. Journal of Industrial Ecology, 5, no. 2, 9-12.

Lindhqvist, T. (2001). Extended Producer Responsibility for End-of-Life Vehicles in Sweden: analysis of effectiveness and socio-economic consequences. Study commissioned by BIL Sweden for the Committee for Producer Responsibility Review (M 2000:01). IIIEE Reports 2001:18. IIIEE: Lund.

Tojo, N, Lindhqvist, T, & Davis, G. (2001). EPR Programme Implementations: institutional and structural factors. In OECD Seminar on Extended Producer Responsibility, EPR: Programme Implementation and Assessment, 13–14 December 2001, Paris.

Lindhqvist, T. (2001). Cleaner Production: government policies and strategies. Industry and Environment, 24, no. 1-2, 41-45.

Lindhqvist, T. (2000). Extended Producer Responsibility in Cleaner Production. IIIEE Dissertation 2000:2. Lund: IIIEE, Lund University.

Lifset, R, & Lindhqvist, T. (1999). Extended Producer Responsibility: Does Leasing Improve End of Product Life Management. Journal of Industrial Ecology, 3, no. 4, 10-13.

Lindhqvist, T. (1998). What is Extended Producer Responsibility. In K. Jönsson, & T. Lindhqvist, Extended Producer Responsibility as a Policy Instrument – what is the Knowledge in the Scientific Community? (3-10). AFR-Report 212. Stockholm: Swedish Environmental Protection Agency.

Lindhqvist, T, & Rydén, E. (1997). Designing EPR for Product Innovation. In OECD International Workshop on Extended Producer Responsibility: Who is the producer?, 2–4 December 1997, Ottawa, Canada.

Lindhqvist, T, & Lifset, R. (1997). What’s in a Name: Producer or Product Responsibility?. Journal of Industrial Ecology, 1, no. 2, 6-7. Rydén, E, & Lindhqvist, T. (1996). Strategies for the Management of End-of-Life Cars - Introducing an Incentive for Clean Car Development (601-607). In Towards Clean Transport - Fuel Efficient and Clean Motor Vehicles, OECD Documents.

Backman, M, Lindhqvist, T, & Thidell, Å. (1995). Nordisk miljömärkning [Nordic Environmental Labelling]. TemaNord 1995:594. Copenhagen: Nordic Council of Ministers.

Lidgren, K, Backman, M, Lindhqvist, T, & Pelin, L. (1994). Avfallsfri framtid [A Future without Waste]. Betänkande av avfallsskatteutredningen, SOU 1994:114.

Lindhqvist, T, & Rydén, E. (1994). The Trade Implications of Recycling of Automobiles. In Life-Cycle Management and Trade (149-158). Paris: OECD.

Lindhqvist, T. (1993). A European Perspective on the Limitations and Possibilities of Life-Cycle Assessments. In K. Geiser and F. H. Irwin, Rethinking the Materials We Use: A New Focus for Pollution Policy (65-70). WWF: Washington DC.

Kisch, P, & Lindhqvist, T. (1992). Differentierade taxor [Differentiated Waste Charges]. RVF Rapport 92:16. RVF: Malmö.

Lindhqvist, T. (1992). Mot ett förlängt producentansvar - analys av erfarenheter samt förslag [Towards an Extended Producer Responsibility - analysis of experiences and proposals]. In Ministry of the Environment and Natural Resources, Varor som faror - Underlagsrapporter [Products as Hazards - background documents] (229-291). Ds 1992:82.

Kisch, P, Lindhqvist, T, & Rodhe, H. (1992). LCA as a Tool for Decision Making - Complications and Limitations. In OECD-IEA Expert Workshop on Life-cycle Analysis: Methods and Experience, 21–22 May 1992, Paris.

Lindhqvist, T. (1992). Extended Producer Responsibility. In T. Lindhqvist, Extended Producer Responsibility as a Strategy to Promote Cleaner Products (1-5). Lund: Department of Industrial Environmental Economics, Lund University.

Backman, M, & Lindhqvist, T. (1992). The Nature of the Waste Problem - A Question of Prevention. In The Treatment and Handling of Wastes (27-40). Chapman & Hall: London.

Hirsbak, S, Nielsen, B, & Lindhqvist, T. (1990). ECO-Products: Proposal for a European Community Environmental Label. Taastrup, Denmark: Danish Technological Institute.

Lindhqvist, T, & Lidgren, K. (1990). Modeller för förlängt producent¬ansvar [Models for Extended Producer Responsibility]. In Ministry of the Environment, Från vaggan till graven - sex studier av varors miljöpåverkan [From the Cradle to the Grave - six studies of the environmental impact of products] (7-44). Ds 1991:9.

Lidgren, K, & Lindhqvist, T. (1989). Avfall - Ekonomiska styrmedel, Förslag till åtgärdsprogram avseende ekonomiska styrmedel inom avfallsområdet [Waste - Economic Instruments, Proposal for Programme Concerning the Use of Economic Instruments in the Waste Management Field]. Miljöavgiftsutredningen [The Environmental Fee Committee]: Stockholm

Lindhqvist, T. (1989). Deposit Systems and Materials Recycling. BioCycle, 30, no. 7, 48-52.

Lindhqvist, T. (1989). The Environmental Product Declaration, EPD. UN ECE Seminar on Economic Implications of Low-waste Technology in the Hague, 16–19 October 1989. UN ECE. ENVWA/SEM.3/R.8.

Backman, M, & Lindhqvist, T. (1988). Pantsystem för batterier [Deposit-Refund System for Batteries]. Report 3489. Solna, Sweden: Swedish Environmental Protection Agency.

Backman, M, Lindhqvist, T, Lidgren, K, & Smitt, R. (1988). Miljö och förpackningar [Environment and Packaging]. Report 3488. Solna, Sweden: Swedish Environmental Protection Agency.

Backman, M, Huisingh, D, Lidgren, K, & Lindhqvist, T. (1988). Om en avfallsstyrd produktutveckling [About a Waste Conscious Product Development]. Report 3487. Solna, Sweden: Swedish Environmental Protection Agency.
