= Mobile phone recycling =

Waste management practices for mobile phone devices

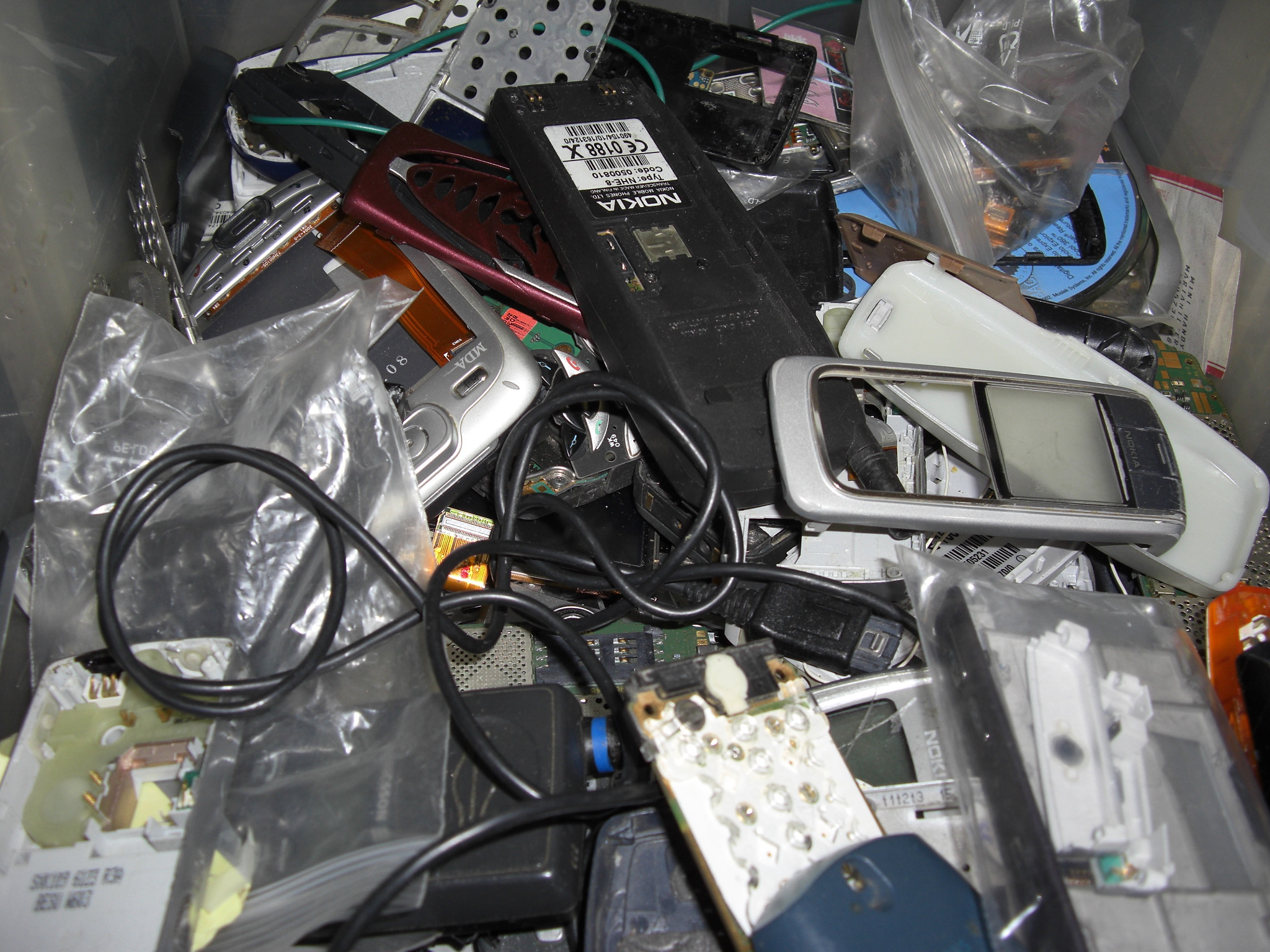
Scrapped mobile phones

Mobile phone recycling is the waste management of mobile phones, to retrieve materials used in their manufacture. Rapid technology change, low initial cost, and planned obsolescence have resulted in a fast-growing surplus, which contributes to the increasing amount of electronic waste around the globe.

Electronic waste (e-waste) is a global problem. It is improperly dismantled and burned, producing toxic emissions harmful to waste site workers, children, and nearby communities.

== Recycling ==
Most cell phones contain precious metals and plastics that can be recycled to save energy and resources that would otherwise be required to mine or manufacture. When placed in a landfill, these materials can pollute the air and contaminate soil and drinking water.

Humans toss millions of cell phones each year in favor of newer technology—and all those discarded phones may be taking a toll on the environment. Electronic scrap accounts for 70% of the overall toxic waste currently found in landfills in the U.S.A. According to the U.S. Environmental Protection Agency (EPA), 420 million mobile phones were discarded in 2009 and only 12 million of those were collected for recycling.

A cell phone's shelf life is only about 24 months for the average user. This means that newer cell phone models are constantly put up on the market to replace older ones. This is as a result of the rapid progression of technology in the mobile industry. According to Matt Ployhar of Intel, the industry is rapidly evolving, possibly even at "Moore's law pace or faster." This means that newer cell phone models are continually on the rise of consumerism and more outdated models are likely to end up in landfills.

== Process ==
=== Chemical composition ===
Mobile phones have a rich and complex composition for recycling. In one ton of cellphones, there are 3,573 grams of silver, 368 grams of gold, and 287 grams of palladium. Mobile phones typically contain the following components: printed circuit board (PCB), liquid crystal display (LCD), camera, flexible substrate and motor, and speaker and microphone. These components are made from hazardous, precious, and base elements. The PCB is made of lead, arsenic, gold, silver, copper, aluminum, and other base metals. The LCD is made of gold, silver, arsenic, barium, copper, and other base metals. The camera is made of silver, copper, and nickel. The flexible substrate and motor is made of silver, gold, copper, and platinum. The speaker and microphone are made of copper, manganese, and zinc.

=== Collection ===
Methods for collecting used mobile phones include the following incentives: pre-paid shipping labels and envelopes, take-back programs, and drop-off points. Some companies and manufacturers offer pre-paid shipping labels online so that consumers can ship their used devices free of charge. Take-back programs give consumers monetary incentives in the forms of account credits, discounts, and lump-sum cash payments to promote the recycling of mobile phones. For instance, the Apple Trade In program gives consumers a credit towards their next purchase or an Apple Gift Card when they trade in an eligible device. Manufacturers also maintain drop-off boxes or points located in stores and facilities. Drop-off points are usually found in highly visible and high-traffic areas that pose convince to potential recyclers.

== Global impact ==
Electronic waste (e-waste) is a global problem; especially since many developed countries, including the U.S., ship their discarded electronic devices to less developed parts of the world. Oftentimes, the e-waste is improperly dismantled and burned, producing toxic emissions harmful to waste site workers, children, and nearby communities. Therefore, it is important for cell phone users to dispose of and recycle their devices responsibly and ethically.

Mobile phones currently pose a huge problem for numerous countries around the world. Manufacturers and agencies are slowly adapting new programs in an effort to curtail the amount of waste that has been rising over the years.

=== Australia ===
A national mobile recycling program was accredited in 2014. This program, MobileMuster, originated in 1998 after a successful recycling trial in one of their states. Currently, its main focus is centered around mobile phones, batteries and any related accessories. They collaborate with over 1,400 retailers, local councils, government agencies and businesses in their recycling efforts. In 2005 MobileMuster launched a campaign that gathered statistical data showing 46% of the Australian population was aware of the option to recycle their mobile devices and its accessories. The greatest benefit that arose from this research was the simple fact that raising public awareness of a recycling program actually lead to a large spike in the number of devices being recycled. In March 2006, awareness had increased to 54%. By the end of June more than 590,000 devices and 1.5 million batteries had been collected by MobileMuster. This amounts to roughly 367 tons of material, which is the equivalent to a 16% increase in the number of devices over the span of a year. Today, they are placing a heavy emphasis on not only recycling phones but rather reusing them. The reasoning behind this is that reusing leads to a decreased amount of resources being extracted from the environment, therefore minimizing the impact.

=== North America ===
Because the U.S. has not ratified the Basel Convention or its Ban Amendment, and has no domestic laws forbidding the export of toxic waste, the Basel Action Network estimates that about 69% of the electronic waste directed to recycling in the U.S. does not get recycled there at all, but is put on container ships and sent to countries such as China.

It was originally predicted that volumes for the US mobile phone recycling industry would see a notable increase until at least 2019, due to an upturn in mobile phone ownership and therefore a larger base of phones would be available for recycling. However the amount of ownership has exceeded most historic industry expectations - approximately 150 million mobile phones are discarded each year in the USA. Approximately 17 tonnes of copper and 0.3 tonnes of silver can be recovered per 1 million devices recycled. A 'marginal' amount of gold and palladium can also be extracted.

A report released in early 2014 found that when it comes to mobile phone recycling programs, cash is the single biggest incentive for consumers in recycling phones. As more people became aware of the monetary value of their old cell phones and other small electronics such as tablets, comparison websites showing users the latest buying prices grew in popularity. There are now dozens of electronics buyback companies that will purchase electronics from consumers and organizations. Trusted buyback companies are focused on paying out cash for unused, old, or broken electronics. These companies are helping drive growth in the circular economy of used devices.

The first mobile phone recycling company in the U.S. was ReCellular, which was founded in 1991 when there were only 16 million mobile subscribers worldwide; it went bankrupt in 2013.

California passed the Cell Phone Recycling Act of 2004, which requires cell phone retailers to collect the cell phones for reuse, recycling, or disposal, making it easier for consumers to recycle their old cell phones. As of July 1, 2006, it is unlawful for a retailer to sell a cell phone to a consumer in California unless the retailer complies with this law. California's Department of Toxic Substances Control reported that in 2020, 8.47 million phones were sold in California and 1.34 million phones were returned for recycling, which amounts to a 15.9% recycling rate. This rate was an increase from 2019, when the recycling rate was 8.6%.

=== United Kingdom ===
Both the United Kingdom and mainland Europe have a significant problem with e-waste; the UK alone produces roughly 1.65 million tonnes annually, one of the highest per-capita rates in Europe, of which only around 30–45% is formally collected for recycling.

Researchers at Plymouth University found that for each mobile phone produced, 15 kg of ore needs to be mined, including 7 kg of high-grade gold ore, 1 kg of typical copper ore, 750g of typical tungsten ore and 200g of typical nickel ore. In the UK, only around 12% of all mobile phones that have been sold have gone on to be recycled.

According to a study from Compare and Recycle, people in the UK upgraded their mobile phones at least 3 times in the past 10 years, and 22% of people chose to trade in or resell their used mobile phones. However, 40% kept old mobile phones stashing them in their homes.

== Value of recycling ==
Mobile phones have value well after their intended use. Yet the value of these phones to recyclers is marginal and relies on high volume to become profitable. The economic value of recycled cell phones is split into two categories; refurbished units that are resold to end users and phones that have no value to retail consumers that are recycled for their precious metals.

The University of California Santa Barbara published a study in 2010 on the subject called, "Economics of Cell Phone Reuse and Recycling" that states the value of reused and recycled cell phones. In 2006, according to the study the average cost for U.S. cell phone refurbishers ReCellular, PaceButler and RMS was $2.10 while the average revenue from said phones was $17. Of the two recycling methods, refurbishment of cell phones is significantly more profitable than recycling the internal parts.

The study also describes the value of all precious metals inside of cell phones, as well as the cost of extracting those metals. The average cost in 2006 to extract the precious metals for the U.S. cell phone recycling company ECS Refining was $0.18, while the average revenue from the recycled metals was $0.75. With a profit margin significantly smaller than refurbished units, this method of gaining economic value from the recycling of cell phones is significantly more volume-dependent. The most valuable precious metal in cell phones is gold, which is used in the unit's microprocessor. This precious metals percentage of the total mass of phones has constantly decreased over time. From 1992 to 2006, gold as a percentage of total mass of cell phones dropped from 0.06% to 0.03%. There is a significant amount of volume in the U.S. market, with Americans in 2009 throwing away on average 350,000 cell phones a day but with thinning margins, volume starts to become irrelevant.

== See also ==
- Computers and the environment
- Closing the loop
- FairPhone
- E-waste
- Refurbishment (electronics)
- Extended producer responsibility
- Phonebloks
