= Computers for Schools (Canada) =

Computers For Schools (CFS) (French: Ordinateurs pour les écoles) (OPÉ) is a pan Canadian program, founded in 1993 by both Industry Canada and the TelecomPioneers. The Computers for Schools (CFS) Program is a national, Innovation, Science, Economic Development Canada-led initiative that has offshoots in all provinces and territories. The different organizations operating the program collect and refurbish donated surplus computers from both public and private sector sources, and redistribute them to schools, public libraries, not-for-profit organizations and Aboriginal communities throughout Canada.

Since 1993, CFS has donated over 1.5 million refurbished computers nationwide, reducing the overall impact on the environment.

In 2015, $2 million was announced to expand the Computers for Schools program to include non-profit organizations that support low-income Canadians and new Canadians with access to refurbished equipment.

The CFS program has workshops throughout Canada, in every province and territory.

== See also ==
- Computer recycling
