= InterConnection.org =

American non-profit organization

Coordinates: 47.649167°N 122.342968°W

- Company type: 501(c)(3)
- Industry: Technology, International Development
- Founded: 1999
- Founder: Charles Brennick
- Fate: Defunct, operations and assets acquired by PCs for People
- Headquarters: 3415 Stone Way N. Seattle, Washington; United States
- Key people: Charles Brennick, Founder/RPCV
- Products: High-Quality, Low-Cost Refurbished Computers
- Services: Project Assistance, Free Web-design Consultation
- Website: www.interconnection.org

InterConnection's Computer Reuse and Learning Center

InterConnection.org (IC) was an American 501(c)(3), non-profit organization headquartered in Seattle, Washington. InterConnection was established in 1999 by Charles Brennick. The organization's original focus was on developing and donating websites to non-profits in developing countries. The program soon expanded to include computer donations and technology training. In 2004 the InterConnection Computer Reuse and Learning Center opened in Seattle as a hub to serve both local and international communities. On February 1st 2025 InterConnection was absorbed into the larger nationwide non-profit organization PCs for People. The former InterConnection location, operations, and staff became PCs for People Washington.

== Activities ==
In pursuance of its Mission InterConnection manages and promotes a number of program activities. The following are four of InterConnection's main program activities:

=== Equipment collection ===
As technology advances many businesses, organizations and individuals find themselves with outdated computer equipment but no way to dispose of it properly. InterConnection's Computer Reuse and Learning Center, in Seattle, Washington, provided a location to properly dispose of old computer equipment in an environmentally friendly way. InterConnection accepts all computer equipment, regardless of condition. InterConnection managed programs for both computer recycling and computer reuse. In 2007 alone, InterConnection kept 6,000 PCs out of landfills.

=== Refurbished computers ===
Computers refurbished by InterConnection's low-income volunteers were made available to under-served communities around the world for a small sourcing fee.

=== Internet services ===
InterConnection's original purpose was to design and host free websites for small organizations working in the developing world. InterConnection shifted focus over time to its refurbished computer and training programs. InterConnection continued to provide organizations with free web-design, web-hosting and free email services.

== Partnerships ==
=== Computer recipients ===
InterConnection has supplied over 25,000 refurbished computers to organizations around the world. The following is information on just a few of InterConnection's computer recipients:

Country	Systems	Recipients	Partner Organization
Chile	4000	Schools	Chilenter
Morocco	420	Schools	Sefrioui-Badissy Foundation
Iraq	367	Schools	Various
Various	225	Microsoft's Community Learning Center's	Microsoft
Uruguay	201	Schools	Various
Fiji	160	Schools	Various
Chile	50	Various Development Groups	World Vision
Guinea	20	Various Development Groups	Peace Corps Volunteers
Paraguay	20	Various Development Groups	Peace Corps Volunteers
