= ReCellular =

Defunct cell phone recycling company

- Company type: Private
- Industry: Recycling
- Founded: 1991
- Founder: Charles Newman
- Defunct: 2013
- Fate: Bankrupt
- Headquarters: Ann Arbor, Michigan
- Key people: Charles Newman, Chairman
- Products: Cell phones
- Website: www.mobilekarma.com

ReCellularX, ReCellular Solutions
- Company type: Private
- Industry: Consulting
- Founded: 2014
- Founder: Ken Scourtas
- Fate: Active
- Headquarters: Boston, Massachusetts
- Key people: Ken Scourtas, President/Founder
- Products: Mobile Data Science and Optimization
- Revenue: $1.8M (2022)
- Website: [www.recellularsolutions.com]

- ReCellular was a recycler and reseller of cell phones, founded in 1991. ReCellular collected cell phones for resale and recycling, collecting more than 125,000 phones each week. In 2014, the brand was reimagined, retooled, and the new ReCellular Solutions born.

ReCellular moved its headquarters from Dexter, Michigan to Ann Arbor, Michigan in 2011, amid layoffs of about 70 people. In 2013, it closed the Dexter facility and filed for receivership, a form of bankruptcy.

== Reuse and recycling ==
Approximately 60% of the phones ReCellular collected were reprogrammed and sold for reuse. For the phones that are successfully repaired, " About half of the rebuilt phones end up with domestic re-sellers, the other half in developing countries in Africa, South America, and Asia. They typically sell for $16 to $18, of which ReCellular's partners receive as much as $5 to $10 per phone for charities of their choosing."

Obsolete or non-functional phones are passed on to Sims Recycling Solutions to be dismantled and recycled in order to reclaim valuable materials, such as: gold, silver and palladium from circuit boards; copper wiring from phone chargers; nickel, iron, cadmium and lead from battery packs; and plastic from cases and accessories.

In November 2006, the magazine Inc. named ReCellular to the Green 50.

== See also ==
- Electronic waste in the United States
- Sims Recycling Solutions
