= Take-back system =

Sellers or manufacturers accepting returns of products at the end of their lives

A take-back system or simply takeback is one of the primary channels of waste collection, especially for e-waste, besides municipal sites. Take-back is the idea that manufacturers and sellers have a collection method that allows consumers to bring back the products at the end of their lives. Take-back is aimed to reduce a business' environmental impacts on the earth and also increase efficiency and lower costs for their business models. "Take-back regulations have targeted a wide array of products including packaging, batteries, automobiles, and electronics", and economic value can be found from recycling or re-manufacturing such products. "The programs benefit municipalities by lowering their overall waste disposal costs and reducing the burden on landfill sites". Although for certain companies, the take-back system is mandatory under legislation, many do it voluntarily.

Once a consumer has utilized a product to its full potential and is ready to dispose of, they may be able to see if the product as a Take-back system:

1. Research the product and see if it qualifies for a Take back system
2. Contact the company and see how they collect used product (ex. mail or drop off at store location)
3. Proceed with directions from company on how to give the product back to the company.

It can be further split into two types:

- Recycling: The products materials are now going to be created into something else.
- Re-manufacturing: The product materials are going to be re-used for a similar manufactured product.

== Recycling ==
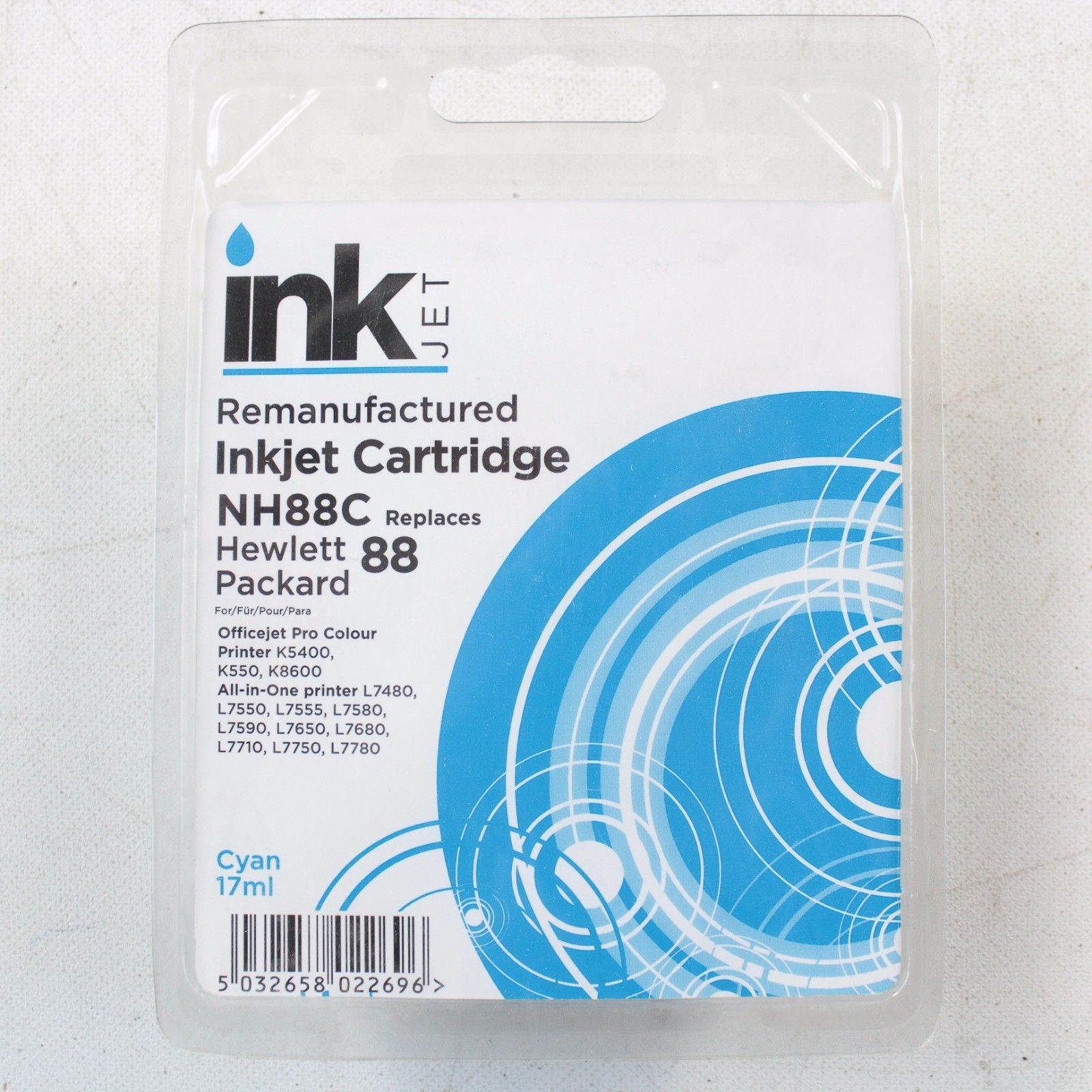
(Note: Lost Parcels, "Remanufactured Inkjet Cartridge NH88C Replaces Hewlett Packard HP88 Cyan 17ml". Flickr, https://www.flickr.com/photos/lostparcels/33444514691/.) An example of a re-manufactured ink cartridge.

One major option of the take-back system includes store retailers or producers taking back the products that have been distributed to their consumers in order to recycle the materials of these products. The take-back system encourages businesses to redesign their products into ones that are easily recyclable, reducing the burden that virgin materials have on the environment for the present and the future. This also gives companies an alternative supply of raw minerals.

== Remanufacturing ==
The other major option of the take-back system includes the store retailers or producers taking back their products in order to create new ones. This process uses the older products in order to restore it into products that are of the same quality as the new ones. By this process, companies save up to 85% of energy that would have been used to manufacture brand-new products. When a company chooses to remanufacture a product, they are giving that product another life.

== Economic effect ==
The take-back system has shown economic effects for many companies that have adapted it. An example is Xerox, a company that has saved over $200 million from their take-back program in a year alone. The system encourages companies to create products that are easy to dissemble and re-manufacture in order to cut costs and generate revenue through taking back used products. In this way, companies can use products that would have otherwise been thrown away in order to renovate them, allowing for them to be sold again just as Sprint has, in order to save over a billion dollars. In Wisconsin, the development of a take-back system created many new jobs, started a few companies, and had brought revenue from e-waste processing.

== Environmental impact ==
The take-back system provides a more environmentally friendly system for those that inherit it. The system gives the responsibility of handling waste to the producer, meaning that they are to guarantee that their products are dealt with when they are at the end of their lives. By taking old products back, companies reduce their environmental footprint on the world as their products are influenced to become more easily recyclable. The system influences companies to redesign their products in ways that are more cost-effective when they recycle, reuse, or re-manufacture their products. Policies of the system can require companies into using a certain amount of recycled material in their products, which reduces the amount of recovered materials that end up in landfills or incineration.

== Circular economy ==
The take-back system can be a main component to the business model that is called the circular economy. The circular economy is a plan for a business or company that aims to use and reduce their waste in order to become sustainable on their own. The take-back system allows for this model to work as it allows companies to recycle old products in order to become more environmentally friendly, where materials are used from these old products in order to use as resources and encourage sustainability. Not only that, but for most companies, the take-back system shows to be a more cost-effective system as it effectively minimizes waste management costs.

== Implementation of take-back systems ==
=== Collection ===
Due to a high cost in recycling but low amount of customer incentive, companies and countries refrain from adapting a take-back system. To fix this, e-waste could be taken aback by the producers for donations, for re-manufacturing, or for upgrades.

=== Waste regulation legislation and government help ===
Without legislation, a prominent take-back system cannot be achieved because current e-waste regulation systems are "limited to private recycling of high-value waste with only limited consumer participation". Rules and regulations that would incentive and fix issues regarding the dumping of electronic waste into landfills and prevent the illegal exportation of electronic waste are important to achieve success in e-waste management. The government would need to support it by giving incentives and the correct infrastructure in order to create such a system.

=== Initiatives ===
"Initiatives refer to programs or schemes required to promote effective collection, recycling and disposal of e-waste". Through these incentives, the government and producers of waste must promote e-waste management on their own by giving effort in collecting e-waste to recycle, renew, or reuse it.

=== Awareness and responsibility ===
Consumers of the products must become aware to how managing their waste affects the environment, and the lack of programs that help teach these aspects show to be big barriers to the effective management of waste. To manage the waste properly, consumers must begin to show responsibility in bringing in their e-waste, while companies such as the producers of these products must be responsible for taking it back and dealing with it.

== Germany's take-back system ==
Germany had set in put a packaging ordinance on June 12, 1991. "It specifies mandatory quotas for recycling for glass, paper/paperboard/carton, tin plate, aluminum, plastic, and composites". The responsibility for handling waste was put onto the manufacturer and distributor. As a result of the ordinance, "in 1993, the beginning of the mandatory quotas, compared to 1992, there were 500,000 fewer tons of packaging" and "From 1993 to 1994, paper packaging recycling increased from 55% to 70.6%". The system showed to be a success, as it reduced waste and redesigned packaging to be more environmentally friendly simply from integrating a version of the take-back system.

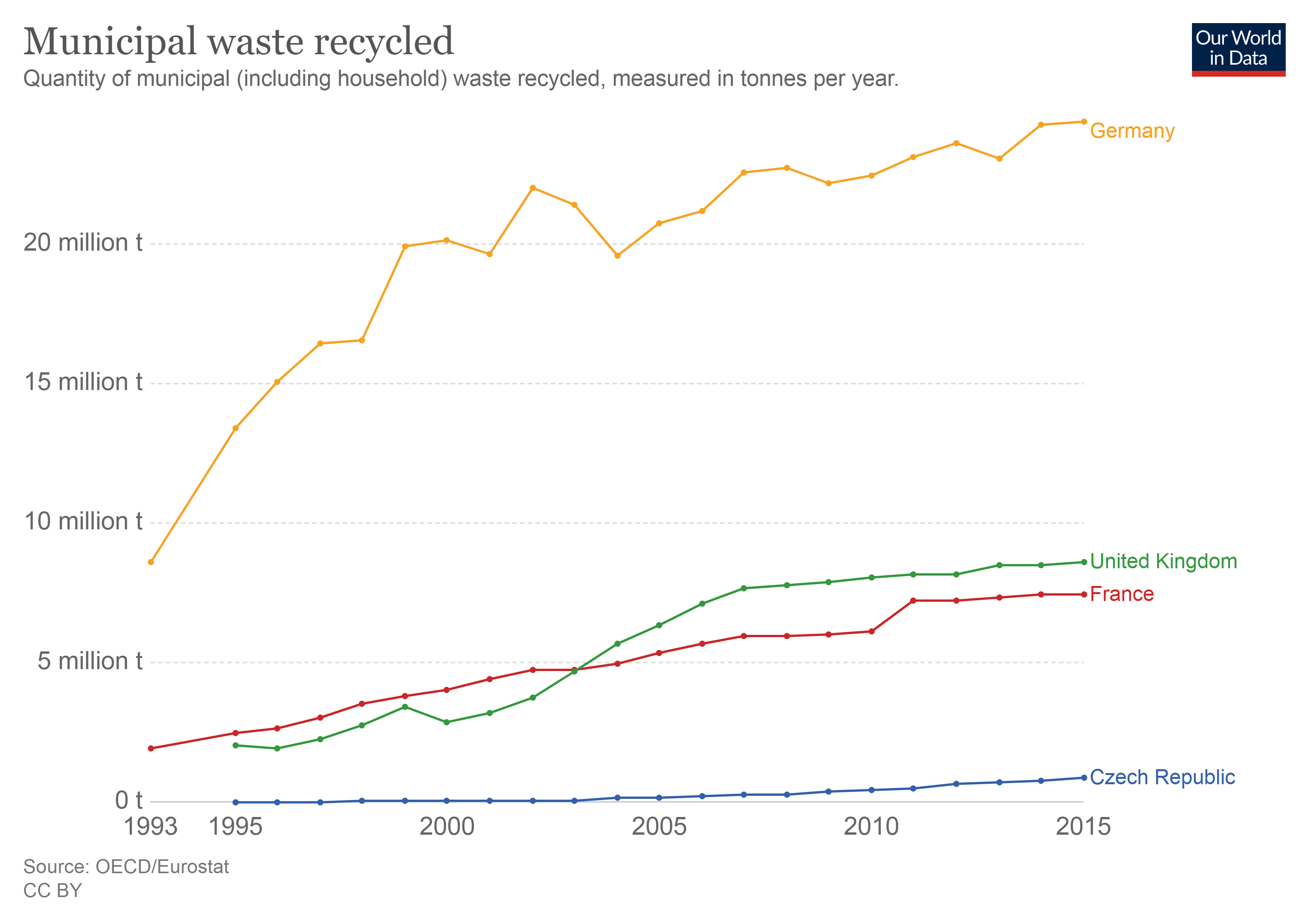
(Note: "Municipal Waste Recycled". Our World in Data, https://ourworldindata.org/grapher/municipal-waste-recycled?tab=chart&time=1993..2015.) Germany at the top of most municipal waste recycled.

== Issues ==
While the take-back system aims to create more eco-friendly businesses, there are reasons why it does not profoundly exist today. The main reason for this is the lack of incentives. Being that there are products such as cars and computers that are unappealing to transport, the consumer finds it troubling and unappealing to bring these products back. Also, since many consumers see refurbished products as inferior and do not trust them, it is unappealing for companies to re-manufacture their own products for reselling purposes and thus cannot profit from it. Without the appropriate subsidies, in some cases it becomes more beneficial for a company to use virgin materials as opposed to recycling methods as it is cheaper, swaying some away from the take-back system.

== Potential ==
With implementing a take-back system the consumer is able to dispose of a product they are no longer benefiting from. The company can then recycle or remanufacture the used product. The system allows companies to save money by reusing materials for new products. It reduces waste in landfills and allows companies to reuse good materials like aluminum and earth materials that are rare. This can also lead to lower product cost because companies aren't having to pay for as many materials.

== See also ==
- Extended producer responsibility
- Right to repair
