= Extended producer responsibility =

Strategy to integrate environmental costs associated with goods

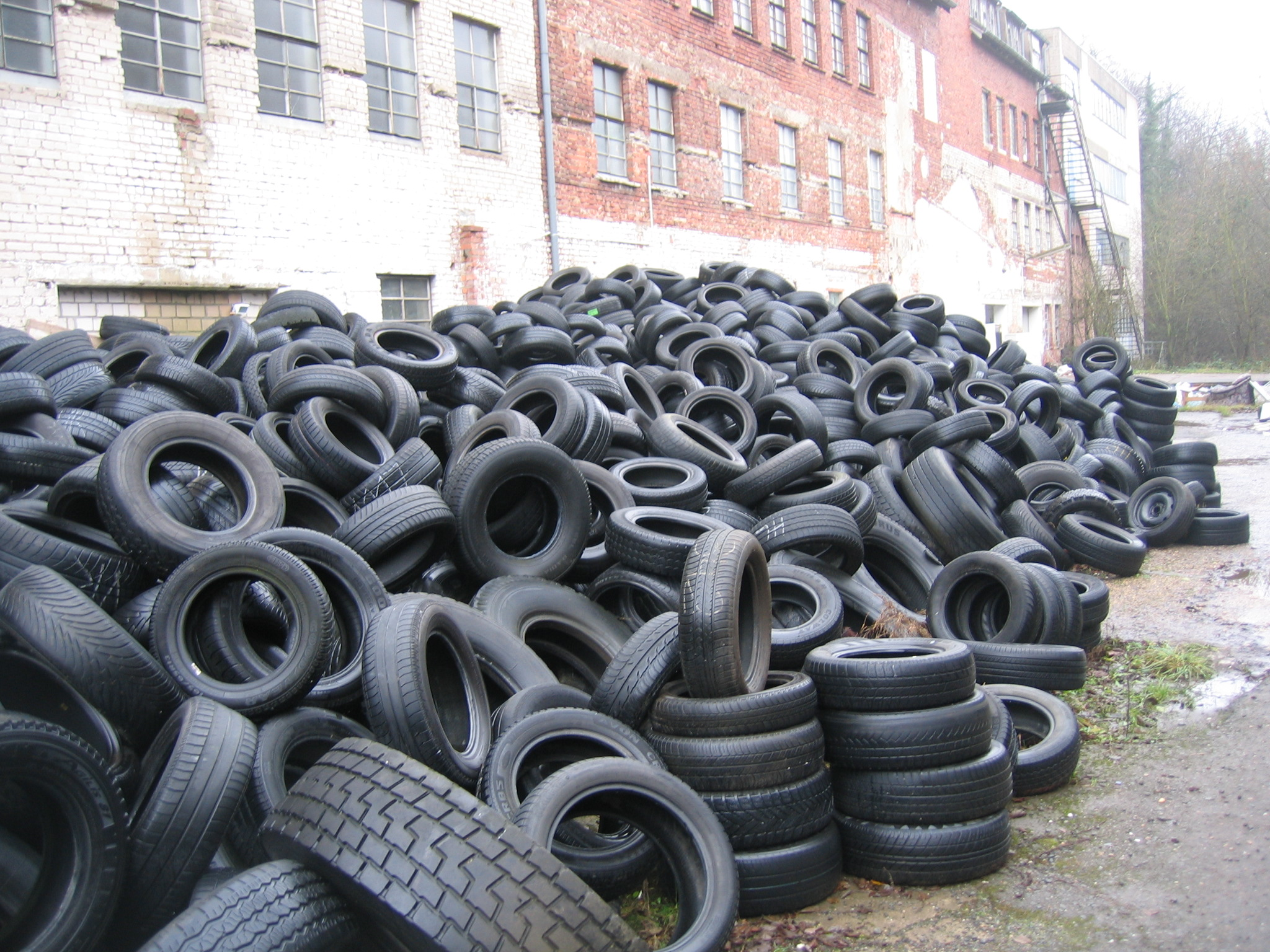
Tires are an example of products subject to extended producer responsibility in many industrialized countries.

Extended producer responsibility (EPR) is a strategy to add all of the estimated environmental costs associated with a product throughout the product life cycle to the market price of that product, contemporarily mainly applied in the field of waste management. Such societal costs are typically externalities to market mechanisms, with a common example being the impact of cars.

Extended producer responsibility legislation is a driving force behind the adoption of remanufacturing initiatives because it "focuses on the end-of-use treatment of consumer products and has the primary aim to increase the amount and degree of product recovery and to minimize the environmental impact of waste materials".

Passing responsibility to producers as polluters is not only a matter of environmental policy but also the most effective means of achieving higher environmental standards in product design.

== Origin ==
The concept was first formally introduced in Sweden by Thomas Lindhqvist in a 1990 report to the Swedish Ministry of the Environment. In subsequent reports prepared for the Ministry, the following definition emerged: "[EPR] is an environmental protection strategy to reach an environmental objective of a decreased total environmental impact of a product, by making the manufacturer of the product responsible for the entire life-cycle of the product and especially for the take-back, recycling and final disposal."

== Definition ==
Extended producer responsibility uses financial incentives to encourage manufacturers to design environmentally friendly products by holding producers responsible for the costs of managing their products at end of life. This policy approach differs from product stewardship, which shares responsibility across the chain of custody of a product, in that it attempts to relieve local governments of the costs of managing certain priority products by requiring manufacturers to internalize the cost of recycling within the product price. EPR is based on the principle that manufacturers (usually brand owners) have the greatest control over product design and marketing and have the greatest ability and responsibility to reduce toxicity and waste.

EPR may take the form of a reuse, buyback, or recycling program. The producer may also choose to delegate this responsibility to a third party, a so-called producer responsibility organization (PRO), which is paid by the producer for used-product management. In this way, EPR shifts the responsibility for waste management from government to private industry, obliging producers, importers and/or sellers to internalise waste management costs in their product prices and ensure the safe handling of their products. However, different stakeholders perceive the concept and the role of producers in various ways.

An example of a producer responsibility organization is PRO Europe S.P.R.L. (Packaging Recovery Organisation Europe), founded in 1995, the umbrella organization for European packaging and packaging waste recovery and recycling schemes. Product stewardship organizations like PRO Europe are intended to relieve industrial companies and commercial enterprises of their individual obligation to take back used products through the operation of an organization which fulfills these obligations on a nationwide basis on behalf of their member companies. The aim is to ensure the recovery and recycling of packaging waste in the most economically efficient and ecologically sound manner. In many countries, this is done through the Green Dot trademark of which PRO Europe is the general licensor. In twenty-five nations, companies are now using the Green Dot as the financing symbol for the organization of recovery, sorting and recycling of sales packaging.

== OECD guidance manuals ==
The OECD published a guidance manual about EPR in 2001 after several years of discussion by experts in this field, and updated it in 2016 to include developing countries' perspectives, based on experiences and policy changes.

== Globally Accountable Extended Producer Responsibility ==
Globally accountable EPR is a term popularised within the textiles space by Ghana-based non-profit The Or Foundation who have long advocated for the acknowledgement of global south countries, such as Ghana in the extended recirculation of clothing and textiles.

== Take-back ==
In response to the growing problem of excessive waste, several countries adopted waste management policies in which manufacturers are responsible for taking back their products from end users at the end of the products' useful life, or partially financing a collection and recycling infrastructure. These policies were adopted due to the lack of collection infrastructure for certain products that contain hazardous materials, or due to the high costs to local governments of providing such collection services. The primary goals of these take-back laws therefore are to partner with the private sector to ensure that all waste is managed in a way that protects public health and the environment. The goals of take-back laws are to

1. encourage companies to design products for reuse, recyclability, and materials reduction;
2. correct market signals to the consumer by incorporating waste management costs into product price;
3. promote innovation in recycling technology.

Take-back programs help promote these goals by creating incentives for companies to design products that minimize waste management costs, to design products that contain safer materials (so they do not need to be managed separately), or to design products that are easier to recycle and reuse (so recycling becomes more profitable). The earliest take-back activity began in Europe, where government-sponsored take-back initiatives arose from concerns about scarce landfill space and potentially hazardous substances in component parts. The European Union adopted a directive on Waste Electrical and Electronic Equipment (WEEE). The purpose of this directive is to prevent the production of waste electronics and also to encourage reuse and recycling of such waste. The directive requires the Member States to encourage design and production methods that take into account the future dismantling and recovery of their products. These take-back programs have been adopted in nearly every OECD country. In the United States, most of these policies have been implemented at the state level.

== Plastic bags ==
Considering that recycling, banning, and taxation fail adequately to reduce the pollution caused by plastic bags, an alternative to these policies would be to increase extended producer responsibility. In the US, under the Clinton presidency, the President's Council on Sustainable Development suggested EPR in order to target different participants in the cycle of a product's life. This can, however, make the product more expensive since the cost must be taken into consideration before being put on the market, which is why it is not widely used in the United States currently. Instead, there is banning or taxation of plastic bags, which puts the responsibility on the consumers. In the United States, EPR is voluntary. Some - including a paper written in 2012 by students at Columbia University - have recommended a comprehensive program which combines taxation, producer responsibility, and recycling to combat pollution.

== Electronics ==
Many governments and companies have adopted extended producer responsibility to help address the growing problem of e-waste—used electrical and electronic equipment that contains materials that cannot be safely thrown away with regular household trash. In 2007, according to the Environmental Protection Agency, people threw away 2.5 million tons of cell phones, TVs, computers, and printers. Many governments have partnered with corporations in creating the necessary collection and recycling infrastructure.

The kinds of chemicals found in e-waste that are particularly dangerous to human health and the environment are lead, mercury, brominated flame-retardants, and cadmium. Lead is found in the screens of phones, TVs and computer monitors and can damage kidneys, nerves, blood, bones, reproductive organs, and muscles. Mercury is found in flat screen TVs, laptop screens, and fluorescent bulbs, and can cause damage to the kidneys and the nervous system. Brominated flame-retardants found in cables and plastic cases can cause cancer, disruption of liver function, and nerve damage. Cadmium is found in rechargeable batteries and can cause kidney damage and cancer. Poorer countries are dumping grounds for e-waste as many governments accept money for disposing of this waste on their lands. This causes increased health risks for people in these countries, especially ones who work or live close to these dumps.

In the United States, 25 states have implemented laws that require the recycling of electronic waste. Of those, 23 have incorporated some form of extended producer responsibility into their laws. According to analysis done by the Product Stewardship Institute, some states have not enacted EPR laws because of a lack of recycling infrastructure and funds for proper e-waste disposal. In contrast, according to a study of EPR legislation by the Electronics TakeBack Coalition (ETBC), states that have seen success in their e-waste recycling programs have done so because they have developed a convenient e-waste infrastructure or the state governments have instituted goals for manufacturers to meet.

Advocates for EPR also argue that including "high expectations for performance" into the laws, and ensuring that those are only minimum requirements, contribute to making the laws successful. The larger the scope of products that can be collected, the more e-waste will be disposed of properly.

Similar laws have been passed in other parts of the world as well. The European Union has taken steps to address some electronic waste management issues. They have restricted the use of harmful substances in member countries and have made it illegal to export waste.

China banned the import of e-waste in 2000, and adopted EPR in 2012. This has proven to be difficult, however, because illegal smuggling of waste still occurs in the country. In order to dispose of e-waste in China today, a license is required and plants are held responsible for treating pollution. EPR laws in the U.S. still allow e-waste to be exported to China. The Institute of Electronics and Electrical Engineers (IEEE) has also proposed a deposit-refund system dealt with by producers.

A 2026 modeling study of electric vehicle battery recycling in China projected that combining stronger producer responsibility enforcement with targeted incentives and improved market conditions could increase the share of retired batteries entering formal recycling channels from about 53% under existing conditions to over 92% by 2060.

=== Advantages ===
When producers face either the financial or physical burden of recycling their electronics after use, they may be incentivized to design more sustainable, less toxic, and more easily recyclable electronics. Using fewer materials and designing products to last longer can directly reduce producers' end-of-life costs. Thus, extended producer responsibility is often cited as one way to fight planned obsolescence, because it financially encourages manufacturers to design for recycling and make products last longer. In addition to fighting planned obsolescence, by allocating part of the financial responsibility for paying for and managing waste on the producer, the pressures placed on governments may be alleviated. Currently, many governments bear the weight of disposal and spend millions of dollars on collecting and removing electronic waste. However, these plans usually fail because governments do not have enough money to create and enforce them properly. Placing responsibility on producers to dispose of their products can give governments more freedom to create legislation which benefits sustainability with little cost to both parties, while also raising awareness about the issues EPR seeks to solve.

One of the advantages of EPR is that it becomes more and more effective as the EPR policy puts pressure on countries that export their E-waste. The regulation of this E-waste forces infrastructure to deal with the waste or implement new ways of creating products from the producers. As more countries adopt these policies it restricts other countries from ignoring the issues. For example, when China stopped importing E-waste from the U.S., a build-up of waste was formed at ports. The lack of infrastructure around recycling E-waste in the US has been possible because of the ability to export and the negligence of producers. The pressure of this growing dump of E-waste forces countries to have their own infrastructure and will force more regulations from the government, state and federal, to be placed on producers.

=== Disadvantages ===
Some people have concerns about extended producer responsibility programs for complex electronics that can be difficult to safely recycle, such as lithium-ion polymer batteries. Others worry that such laws could increase the cost of electronics because producers would add recycling costs into the initial price tag. When companies are required to transport their products to a recycling facility, it can be expensive if the product contains hazardous materials and does not have a scrap value, such as with CRT televisions, which can contain up to five pounds of lead. Organizations and researchers against EPR claim that the mandate would slow innovation and impede technological progress.

Other critics are concerned that manufacturers may use takeback programs to take secondhand electronics off the reuse market, by shredding rather than reusing or repairing goods that come in for recycling. Another argument against EPR is that EPR policies are not accelerating environmentally friendly designs because "manufacturers are already starting to moving toward reduced material-use per unit of output, reduced energy use in making and delivering each product, and improved environmental performance."

The Reason Foundation argues that EPR is not clear in the way fees are established for the particular recycling processes. Fees are set in place to help incentivize recycling, but this may deter the use of manufacturing with better materials for the different electronic products. There are not set fees for certain materials, so confusion occurs when companies do not know what design features to include in their devices.

== Fossil fuels ==
A study suggests that applying the principle of extended producer responsibility to fossil fuels could deconflict energy security and climate policy at an affordable cost; in particular, authors suggested the responsibility could be used to establish the financing of CO_{2} storage and nature-based solutions.

== Implementation ==
EPR has been implemented in many forms, which may be classified into three major approaches:

- Mandatory
- Negotiated
- Voluntary

It is perhaps because of the tendency of economic policy in market-driven economies not to interfere with consumers' preferences that the producer-centric representation is the dominant form of viewing the environmental impacts of industrial production: in statistics on energy, emissions, water, etc., impacts are almost always presented as attributes of industries ("on-site" or "direct" allocation) rather than as attributes of the supply chains of products for consumers. On a smaller scale, most existing schemes for corporate sustainability reporting include only impacts that arise out of operations controlled by the reporting company, and not supply-chain impacts. According to this world view, "upstream and downstream [environmental] impacts are ... allocated to their immediate producers. The institutional setting and the different actors' spheres of influence are not reflected".

On the other hand, a number of studies have highlighted that final consumption and affluence, especially in the industrialised world, are the main drivers for the level and growth of environmental pressure. Even though these studies provide a clear incentive for complementing producer-focused environmental policy with some consideration for consumption-related aspects, demand-side measures to address environmental problems are rarely exploited.

The nexus created by the different views on impacts caused by industrial production is exemplified by several contributions to the discussion about producer or consumer responsibility for greenhouse gas emissions. Emissions data are reported to the IPCC as contributions of producing industries located in a particular country rather than as embodiments in products consumed by a particular population, irrespective of productive origin. However, especially for open economies, taking into account the greenhouse gases embodied in internationally traded commodities can have a considerable influence on national greenhouse gas balance sheets. Assuming consumer responsibility, exports have to be subtracted from, and imports added to national greenhouse gas inventories. In Denmark, for example, Munksgaard and Pedersen (2001) report that a significant amount of power and other energy-intensive commodities are traded across Danish borders, and that between 1966 and 1994 the Danish foreign trade balance in terms of CO_{2} developed from a 7 Mt deficit to a 7 Mt surplus, compared to total emissions of approximately 60 Mt. In particular, electricity traded between Norway, Sweden and Denmark is subject to large annual fluctuations due to varying rainfall in Norway and Sweden. In wet years Denmark imports hydro-electricity whereas electricity from coal-fired power plants is exported in dry years. The official Danish emissions inventory includes a correction for electricity trade and thus applies the consumer responsibility principle.

Similarly, at the company level, "when adopting the concept of eco-efficiency and the scope of an environmental management system stated in for example ISO 14001, it is insufficient to merely report on the carbon dioxide emissions limited to the judicial borders of the company". 7 "Companies must recognise their wider responsibility and manage the entire life-cycle of their products ... Insisting on high environmental standards from suppliers and ensuring that raw materials are extracted or produced in an environmentally conscious way provides a start." A life-cycle perspective is also taken in EPR frameworks: "Producers of products should bear a significant degree of responsibility (physical and/or financial) not only for the environmental impacts of their products downstream from the treatment and disposal of their product, but also for their upstream activities inherent in the selection of materials and in the design of products." "The major impetus for EPR came from northern European countries in the late 1980s and early 1990s, as they were facing severe landfill shortages. [... As a result,] EPR is generally applied to post-consumer wastes which place increasing physical and financial demands on municipal waste management."

EPR has rarely been consistently quantified. Moreover, applying conventional life cycle assessment, and assigning environmental impacts to producers and consumers can lead to double-counting. Using input-output analysis, researchers have attempted for decades to account for both producers and consumers in an economy in a consistent way. Gallego and Lenzen demonstrate and discuss a method of consistently delineating producers' supply chains, into mutually exclusive and collectively exhaustive responsibilities to be shared by all agents in an economy. Their method is an approach to allocating responsibility across agents in a fully inter-connected circular system. Upstream and downstream environmental impacts are shared between all agents of a supply chain—producers and consumers.

== Examples ==
Auto Recycling Nederland (ARN) is a producer responsibility organisation (PRO) that organises vehicle recycling in the Netherlands. An advanced recycling fee is charged to those who purchase a new vehicle and is used to fund the recycling of it at the end of its useful life. The PRO was set up to satisfy the European Union's End of Life Vehicles Directive.

The Swiss Association for Information, Communication and Organisational Technology (SWICO), an ICT industry organisation, became a PRO to address the problem of electronic waste.

The Canada-Wide Action Plan for Extended Producer Responsibility (CAP-EPR) was adopted in Canada in 2009 under the guidance of the Canadian Council of Ministers of the Environment. The CAP-EPR followed years of waste and recycling efforts in Canada that remained largely ineffective as the diversion rates from landfills and incineration persisted. Despite three decades worth of recycling efforts, Canada fell short of many other G8 and OECD countries. Since the CAP-EPR's 2009 inception, most provinces have enforced legislation or restrictions on a wider range of products and materials under EPR programs. "Nine out of ten provinces have [since implemented] EPR programs or [put] requirements in place... As a result of these new programs or requirements and expansion of existing ones, almost half of the product categories for Phase 1 are now covered by legislated EPR programs or requirements across Canada."

In Russia, EPR was launched in 2015 but financing of waste management facilities still largely relies on taxes paid by the Russian population. In 2022, all packaging was supposed to be recycled or else products from companies not respecting the regulation would have been withdrawn from shelves. But the country postponed the reform as several ministers found it unfeasible.

In the United Kingdom an extended producer responsibility system is going to be implemented over the coming years. The government has already shared guidance with those most affected. The core issue is with identifying a way to encourage polluters to take on the responsibility rather than pass on the cost to suppliers or end consumers

In India, the E-Waste (Management and Handling) Rules, 2011 introduced the concept of EPR for the first time, while the E-Waste (Management) Rules, 2016 set more stringent targets for collection of end-of-life products and simplified the process of applying for EPR authorization. In 2016, government expanded the EPR approach to tackle plastic waste through the Plastic Waste Management Rules, 2016. In the Indian system, the trading mechanism is similar to the carbon trading mechanism, where EPR certificates are generated and traded further between the producers and brand owners.

In Austria, the polluter-pays principle was introduced on 1 January 2023. Thus, the costs of recycling are paid by the companies that produce it.

== Results ==
In Germany, since the adoption of EPR, "between 1991 and 1998, the per capita consumption of packaging was reduced from 94.7 kg to 82 kg, resulting in a reduction of 13.4%". Furthermore, due to Germany's influence in EPR, the "European Commission developed one waste directive" for all EU member states [...] One major goal was to have all member states recycle "25% of all packaging material" and the goal has been accomplished.

In the United States, EPR is gaining popularity "with 40 such laws enacted since 2008. In 2010 alone, 38 such EPR bills were introduced in state legislatures across the United States, and 12 were signed into law." However, these laws are set at the state level: there are no federal laws for EPR. So far, "only a handful of states have imposed five to six EPR laws as well as 32 states having at least one EPR law".

From 2022, if the product is sold in France or Germany, Marketplaces must confirm that the manufacturer complies with the Extended Producer Responsibility (EPR) rules in the country where it sells the product.

=== Downsides ===
Several challenges are commonly associated with the implementation of EPR regulations. One frequently discussed concern is the administrative burden created by the variation of regulatory frameworks across countries and waste streams. Because EPR requirements often differ between jurisdictions, producers operating in multiple markets may face complex compliance obligations. In particular, producer responsibility organisations (PROs) require differing registration procedures, reporting formats, and data requirements. As a result, companies that sell products in several countries and across multiple regulated waste streams may experience a substantial increase in administrative complexity.

Several mitigation strategies have been proposed to address these challenges. For example, some stakeholders have suggested the development of a digital "one-stop shop for EPR registrations and reporting, which could harmonise administrative procedures across jurisdictions. Other approaches focus on the use of digital technologies capable of aggregating and processing waste-related data in order to streamline reporting obligations and reduce administrative costs.

Another point of debate concerns the effectiveness of EPR policies in reducing waste and encouraging more sustainable product design. While EPR frameworks were initially designed primarily to ensure that producers contribute financially to waste management systems, many policymakers have expanded their objectives to include the promotion of circular design practices. However, the effectiveness of EPR in achieving these broader environmental goals remains contested. One contributing factor may be the administrative complexity associated with EPR schemes, which can limit their practical implementation. In addition, ambiguities within certain EPR regulations can make enforcement difficult, particularly in cases involving so-called "free riders," companies that fail to comply with their obligations while continuing to place products on the market.

== See also ==
- Takeback, when sellers or manufacturers accept returns of products at the end of their lives
- Life-cycle assessment
- Environmental justice
- Packaging and packaging waste directive (94/62/EC)
- Personal carbon allowance
- German Packaging Act (German EPR law aka VerpackG with ZSVR register and LUCID database)
