= MC21 =

MC21, MC.21, MC-21, MC 21, may refer to:

== Places ==
- Iapygia quadrangle (Mars Chart 21; MC-21), Mars

== Transportation and vehicular ==
- Yakovlev MC-21, a Russian single-aisle twinjet civilian airliner; also known as the Irkut MC-21
- Mitsubishi MC-21, a Japanese twin-prop civilian cargo airplane; the civilian version of the bomber Mitsubishi Ki-21
- Honda MC21, a model of the Honda NSR250R motorcycle

== Other uses ==
- MC21, a family of antibiotics derived from the marine bacterium Pseudoalteromonas phenolica
  - MC21-A
  - MC21-B
- MC21, a Monte-Carlo code; see Neutron transport

== See also ==
- MC (disambiguation)
- 21 (disambiguation)
- M21 (disambiguation)
- C21 (disambiguation)
