= Ion-attachment mass spectrometry =

Form of mass spectrommetry

Ion attachment mass spectrometry
- Acronym: IAMS
- Related items: Chemical ionization

Ion-attachment mass spectrometry (IAMS) is a form of mass spectrometry that uses a "soft" form of ionization similar to chemical ionization in which a cation is attached to the analyte molecule in a reactive collision,

$$\ce{{M} + {X+} + A -> {MX+} + A}$$

where M is the analyte molecule, X^{+} is the cation, and A is a non-reacting collision partner.

== Principle ==
This technique is applicable to gases or any materials that can be vaporized. It uses a non-fragmenting non-conventional ionisation mode, by attachment of a lithium (or alkaline) ion to the gas to be analysed with a more traditional mass filter. This instrument is more dedicated to analysis of moderately-sized molecules such as organic or aromatic compounds.

== Applications ==
Currently, it is used industrially to verify, with a high throughput, the concentrations of brominated flame retardants (BFR) in plastics in compliance with the European Union's RoHS (Restriction of Hazardous Substances) regulation in place since 2006. The banned molecules include PBB and PBDE, whose concentration should not exceed 0.1% w/w.

IAMS has also been used to analyze diesel exhaust particles, in ceramic processing, and in critical silicon etching during semiconductor manufacturing.

== Bibliography ==
- Y. Shiokawa; M. Nakamura; H. Maruyama; Y. Hirano; Y. Taneda; M. Inoue; T. Fujii (2004). "Development of ion attachment mass spectrometry and its applications". Bunseki Kagaku (in Japanese). 53 (6): 475–489. doi:10.2116/bunsekikagaku.53.475.
- M. Nakamura; K. Hino; T. Sasaki; Y. Shiokawa; T. Fujii (2001). "In situ analysis of perfluoro compounds in semiconductor process exhaust: Use of Li+ ion-attachment mass spectrometry". Journal of Vacuum Science and Technology A. 19 (4): 1105. Bibcode:2001JVSTA..19.1105N. doi:10.1116/1.1376704.
- Fujii T.; Selvin P.C.; Sablier M.; Iwase K. (2001). "Lithium ion attachment mass spectrometry for on-line analysis of trace components in air: direct introduction". Journal of Vacuum Science and Technology A. 19 (1): 39–45. Bibcode:2001IJMSp.209...39F. doi:10.1016/S1387-3806(01)00469-9.
- T. Ishiguro; A. Matsunami; K. Matsumoto; K. Kitagawa; N. Arai; A. K. Gupta (2001). "Mass Spectrometric Detection of Ionic and Neutral Species During Highly Preheated Air Combustion by Alkali Element Ion Attachment". Journal of Engineering for Gas Turbines and Power. 19 (4): 1105. doi:10.1115/1.1473158.
