= Battery regulations in the United Kingdom =

In a similar vein to packaging, electronic equipment and vehicles, the concept of extended producer responsibility was applied to battery regulations in the UK through the transposition of the EU Battery Directive into UK legislation. The Directive required member states to have put regulations in place by 26 September 2008. Although the UK managed to introduce the single market requirements by that date, they failed to implement the collection and recycling requirements. Following a consultation, the government laid the new Regulations before Parliament on 16 April 2009, which came into force on 5 May 2009. Responsibility for the financing of waste battery collection and treatment was applied to producers from 1 January 2010, whilst retailers were obliged to offer free take back of portable batteries to consumers from 1 February 2010.

The new Regulations have included some significant changes from the consultation. Only those that place more than one tonne per year onto the market will now have to register through Compliance Schemes and be required to finance collection etc. Those below a tonne will now have to register with one of the environmental Agencies for an annual fee of £30 creating a huge disparity between the two classes of producer as the larger ones are likely to have costs that will run into several thousands of pounds. The threshold for retail involvement has also changed, removing a 280m2 minimum floor space requirement but upping the total weight of batteries sold from 16 kg to 32 kg. This means that any retail premises selling more than approximately 24 AA batteries a week will be required to offer in-store take back. The requirements also apply to industrial and automotive batteries, but given the current value of those and their hazardous nature, there is little change to the current commercial processes that already see them all recovered anyway.

The Directive requires member states to be collecting 25% of portable batteries by the end of 2012. The UK is believed to be collecting around 4%, so this has challenges. Whether the system being proposed will achieve that remains to be seen, but an increase of these proportions has taken several years longer in other EU countries such as the Netherlands.

== Rules ==
In summary, for portable batteries, the regulations require the following:

- Large portable battery producers will have to register with a batteries compliance scheme by mid-October each year, paying an Agency fee of £680 plus a proportion of the scheme's £118k annual registration fee.
- Small producers - those who place one tonne or less onto the market - will have to register with one of the Agencies by mid-October.
- Data from producers for the quantity of portable batteries placed onto the UK market in 2009 must be supplied to the Agencies by 31 January 2010.
- For large producers, this will have a collection target applied - 10% in 2010 - which compliance schemes will have to meet on behalf of their members by setting up collection schemes with retailers, local authorities etc. The target for 2011 is 18% and 2012 is 25%, but the 2010 and 2011 targets are not mandatory.
- Large producers will have to supply data to their scheme quarterly for onward submission to the Agencies. Small producers will only have to supply data once a year.
- All retailers that sell more than 32 kg a year will have to offer in-store take back of batteries, which schemes will then have to collect and recycle. This equates to approximately 25 AA batteries a week.
- Schemes will have to pay £17k to get approved then £118k per year to register their members plus another £680 per year per member
- Schemes will have to demonstrate how they intend to communicate the battery recycling message to consumers

== See also ==
- Battery recycling
