= RoHS =

2003 European Union directive on hazardous materials

Directive 2002/95/EC
- European Union directive
- Title: Directive on the restriction of the use of certain hazardous substances in electrical and electronic equipment
- Made by: Council & Parliament
- Made under: Art. 95 EC
- Journal reference: eur-lex.europa.eu L37, 13 February 2003, pp. 19–23

History
- Date made: 27 January 2003
- Entry into force: 13 February 2003
- Implementation date: 13 August 2004

Preparative texts
- Commission proposal: C365E, 19 December 2000, p. 195, C240E, 28 August 2001, p. 303.
- EESC opinion: C116, 20 April 2001, p. 38.
- CR opinion: C148, 18 May 2001, p. 1.
- EP opinion: C34E, 7 February 2002, p. 109.

Other legislation
- Amended by: Directive 2008/35/EC; Decision 2005/618/EC, Decision 2005/717/EC, Decision 2005/747/EC, Decision 2006/310/EC, Decision 2006/690/EC, Decision 2006/691/EC, Decision 2006/692/EC, Decision 2008/385/EC.
- Replaced by: Directive 2011/65/EU, 3 January 2013

The Restriction of Hazardous Substances Directive 2002/95/EC (RoHS 1), short for Directive on the restriction of the use of certain hazardous substances in electrical and electronic equipment, was adopted in February 2003 by the European Union.

The initiative was to limit the amount of hazardous chemicals in electronics.

The RoHS 1 directive took effect on 1 July 2006, and is required to be enforced and became a law in each member state. The directive restricts (with exceptions) the use of ten hazardous materials in the manufacture of various electronic and electrical equipment. In addition to the exceptions, there are exclusions for products such as solar panels. It is closely linked with the Waste Electrical and Electronic Equipment Directive (WEEE) 2002/96/EC (now superseded) which sets collection, recycling, and reclamation goals for electrical goods and is part of a legislative initiative to solve the problem of huge amounts of toxic electronic waste. In speech, RoHS is often spelled out, or pronounced /rɒs/, /rɒʃ/, /roʊz/, or /ˈroʊhɒz/, and refers to the EU standard, unless otherwise qualified.

== Details ==
Each European Union member state will adopt its own enforcement and implementation policies using the directive as a guide.

RoHS is often referred to as the "lead-free directive", but it restricts the use of the following ten substances:

1. Lead (Pb)
2. Mercury (Hg)
3. Cadmium (Cd)
4. Hexavalent chromium (Cr^{6+})
5. Polybrominated biphenyls (PBB)
6. Polybrominated diphenyl ether (PBDE)
7. Bis(2-ethylhexyl) phthalate (DEHP)
8. Butyl benzyl phthalate (BBP)
9. Dibutyl phthalate (DBP)
10. Diisobutyl phthalate (DIBP)

Maximum Permitted Concentration: 0.1%

Max for Cadmium: 0.01%

DEHP, BBP, DBP and DIBP were added as part of DIRECTIVE (EU) 2015/863 which was published on 31 March 2015.

PBB and PBDE are flame retardants used in several plastics. Hexavalent chromium is used in chrome plating, chromate coatings and primers, and in chromic acid.

The maximum permitted concentrations in non-exempt products are 0.1% or 1000 parts per million (ppm) (except for cadmium, which is limited to 0.01% or 100 ppm) by weight. The restrictions are on each homogeneous material in the product, which means that the limits do not apply to the weight of the finished product, or even to a component, but to any single material that could (theoretically) be separated mechanically – for example, the sheath on a cable or the tinning on a component lead.

As an example, a radio is composed of a case, screws, washers, a circuit board, speakers, etc. The screws, washers, and case may each be made of homogenous materials, but the other components comprise multiple sub-components of many different types of material. For instance, a circuit board is composed of a bare printed circuit board (PCB), integrated circuits (IC), resistors, capacitors, switches, etc. A switch is composed of a case, a lever, a spring, contacts, pins, etc., each of which may be made of different materials. A contact might be composed of a copper strip with a surface coating. A loudspeaker is composed of a permanent magnet, copper wire, paper, etc.

Everything that can be identified as a homogeneous material must meet the limit. So if it turns out that the case was made of plastic with 2,300 ppm (0.23%) PBB used as a flame retardant, then the entire radio would fail the requirements of the directive.

In an effort to close RoHS 1 loopholes, in May 2006 the European Commission was asked to review two currently excluded product categories (monitoring and control equipment, and medical devices) for future inclusion in the products that must fall into RoHS compliance. In addition the commission entertains requests for deadline extensions or for exclusions by substance categories, substance location or weight. New legislation was published in the official journal in July 2011 which supersedes this exemption.

Note that batteries are not included within the scope of RoHS. However, in Europe, batteries are under the European Commission's 1991 Battery Directive (91/157/EEC), which was increased in scope and approved in the new battery directive, version 2003/0282 COD, which will be official when submitted to and published in the EU's Official Journal. While the first Battery Directive addressed possible trade barrier issues brought about by disparate European member states' implementation, the new directive more explicitly highlights improving and protecting the environment from the negative effects of the waste contained in batteries. It also contains a programme for more ambitious recycling of industrial, automotive, and consumer batteries, gradually increasing the rate of manufacturer-provided collection sites to 45% by 2016. It also sets limits of 5 ppm mercury and 20 ppm cadmium to batteries except those used in medical, emergency, or portable power-tool devices. Though not setting quantitative limits on quantities of lead, lead–acid, nickel, and nickel–cadmium in batteries, it cites a need to restrict these substances and provide for recycling up to 75% of batteries with these substances. There are also provisions for marking the batteries with symbols in regard to metal content and recycling collection information.

The directive applies to equipment as defined by a section of the WEEE directive. The following numeric categories apply:

1. Large household appliances
2. Small household appliances
3. IT & telecommunications equipment (although infrastructure equipment is exempt in some countries)
4. Consumer equipment
5. Lighting equipment – including light bulbs
6. Electronic and electrical tools
7. Toys, leisure, and sports equipment
8. Medical devices (exemption removed in July 2011)
9. Monitoring and control instruments (exemption removed in July 2011)
10. Automatic dispensers
11. Other EEE not covered by any of the categories above.

It does not apply to fixed industrial plant and tools. Compliance is the responsibility of the company that puts the product on the market, as defined in the Directive; components and sub-assemblies are not responsible for product compliance. Of course, given the fact that the regulation is applied at the homogeneous material level, data on substance concentrations needs to be transferred through the supply chain to the final producer. An IPC standard has recently been developed and published to facilitate this data exchange, IPC-1752. It is enabled through two PDF forms that are free to use.

RoHS applies to these products in the EU whether made within the EU or imported. Certain exemptions apply, and these are updated on occasion by the EU.

=== Examples of product components containing restricted substances ===
RoHS restricted substances have been used in a broad array of consumer electronics products. Examples of components that have contained lead include:

- paints and pigments
- PVC (vinyl) cables as a stabiliser (e.g., power cords, USB cables)
- solders
- printed circuit board finishes, leads, internal and external interconnects
- glass in television and photographic products (e.g., CRT television screens and camera lenses)
- metal parts
- lamps and bulbs
- batteries
- integrated circuits or microchips

Cadmium is found in many of the components above; examples include plastic pigmentation, nickel–cadmium (NiCd) batteries and CdS photocells (used in night lights). Mercury is used in lighting applications and automotive switches; examples include fluorescent lamps and mercury tilt switches (these are rarely used nowadays). Hexavalent chromium is used for metal finishes to prevent corrosion. Polybrominated biphenyls and diphenyl ethers/oxides are used primarily as flame retardants.

=== Hazardous materials and the high-tech waste problem ===
RoHS and other efforts to reduce hazardous materials in electronics are motivated in part to address the global issue of consumer electronics waste. As newer technology arrives at an ever-increasing rate, consumers are discarding their obsolete products sooner than ever. This waste ends up in landfills and in countries like China to be "recycled".

In the fashion-conscious mobile market, 98 million U.S. cell phones took their last call in 2005. All told, the EPA estimates that in the U.S. that year, between 1.5 and 1.9 million tons of computers, TVs, VCRs, monitors, cell phones, and other equipment were discarded. If all sources of electronic waste are tallied, it could total 50 million tons a year worldwide, according to the UN Environment Programme.

American electronics sent offshore to countries like Ghana in West Africa under the guise of recycling may be doing more harm than good. Not only are adult and child workers in these jobs being poisoned by heavy metals, but these metals are returning to the U.S. "The U.S. right now is shipping large quantities of leaded materials to China, and China is the world's major manufacturing center," Dr. Jeffrey Weidenhamer says, a chemistry professor at Ashland University in Ohio. "It's not all that surprising things are coming full circle and now we're getting contaminated products back."

=== Changing disapproval on toxicity ===
In addition to the high-tech waste problem, RoHS concurs with contemporary research over the past 50 years in biological toxicology that acknowledges the long-term effects of low-level chemical exposure on populations. New testing is capable of detecting much smaller concentrations of environmental toxicants. Researchers are associating those exposures with neurological, developmental, and reproductive changes.

RoHS and other environmental laws are in contrast to historical and contemporary law that seek to address only acute toxicology, that is direct exposure to large amounts of toxic substances causing severe injury or death.

=== Life-cycle impact assessment of lead-free solder ===
The United States Environmental Protection Agency (EPA) has published a life-cycle assessment (LCA) of the environmental impacts of lead-free and tin–lead solder, as used in electronic products. For bar solders, when only lead-free solders were considered, the tin/copper alternative had the lowest (best) scores. For paste solders, bismuth/tin/silver had the lowest impact scores among the lead-free alternatives in every category except non-renewable resource consumption. For both paste and bar solders, all of the lead-free solder alternatives had a lower (better) LCA score in toxicity categories than tin/lead solder. This is primarily due to the toxicity of lead, and the amount of lead that leaches from printed wiring board assemblies, as determined by the leachability study conducted by the partnership. The study results are providing the industry with an objective analysis of the life-cycle environmental effects of leading candidate alternative lead-free solders, allowing industry to consider environmental concerns along with the traditionally evaluated parameters of cost and performance. This assessment is also allowing industry to redirect efforts toward products and processes that reduce solders' environmental footprint, including energy consumption, releases of toxic chemicals, and potential risks to human health and the environment. Another life-cycle assessment by IKP, University of Stuttgart, shows similar results to those of the EPA study.

=== Life-cycle impact assessment of BFR-free plastics ===
The ban on concentrations of brominated flame retardants (BFR) above 0.1% in plastics has affected plastics recycling. As more and more products include recycled plastics, it has become critical to know the BFR concentration in these plastics, either by tracing the origins of the recycled plastics to establish the BFR concentrations, or by measuring the BFR concentrations from samples. Plastics with high BFR concentrations are costly to handle or to discard, whereas plastics with levels below 0.1% have value as recyclable materials.

There are a number of analytical techniques for the rapid measurement of BFR concentrations. X-ray fluorescence spectroscopy can confirm the presence of bromine (Br), but it does not indicate the BFR concentration or specific molecule. Ion attachment mass spectrometry (IAMS) can be used to measure BFR concentrations in plastics. The BFR ban has significantly affected both upstream (plastic material selection) and downstream (plastic material recycling).

=== 2011/65/EU (RoHS 2) ===
The RoHS 2 directive (2011/65/EU) is an evolution of the original directive and became law on 21 July 2011 and took effect on 2 January 2013. It addresses the same substances as the original directive while improving regulatory conditions and legal clarity. It requires periodic re-evaluations that facilitate gradual broadening of its requirements to cover additional electronic and electrical equipment, cables and spare parts. The CE logo now indicates compliance and RoHS 2 declaration of conformity is now detailed (see below).

In 2012, a final report from the European Commission revealed that some EU Member States considered all toys under the scope of the primary RoHS 1 Directive 2002/95/EC, irrespective of whether their primary or secondary functions were using electric currents or electromagnetic fields. From the implementation of RoHS 2 or RoHS Recast Directive 2011/65/EU on, all the concerned Member States will have to comply with the new regulation.

The key difference in the recast is that it is now necessary to demonstrate conformity in a similar way to the LVD and EMC directives. Not being able to show compliance in sufficiently detailed files, and not ensuring it is implemented in production is now a criminal offence. Like the other CE marking directives it mandates production control and traceability to the technical files. It describes two methods of achieving presumption of conformity (Directive 2011/65/EU Article 16.2), either technical files should include test data for all materials or a standard accepted in the official journal for the directive, is used. Currently the only standard is EN IEC 63000:2018 (based on IEC 63000:2016 superseded EN 50581:2012), a risk based method to reduce the amount of test data required (Harmonised Standards list for RoHS2, OJEU C363/6).

One of the consequences of the requirement to demonstrate conformity is the requirement to know the exemption use of each component, otherwise it is not possible to know compliance when the product is placed on the market, the only point in time the product must be 'compliant'. Many do not understand that 'compliance' varies depending on what exemptions are in force and it is quite possible to make a non-compliant product with 'compliant' components. Compliance must be calculated on the day of placing on the market. In reality this means knowing the exemption status of all components and using up stock of old status parts before the expire date of the exemptions (Directive 2011/65/EU Article 7.b referring to Decision 768/2008/EC Module A Internal production control). Not having a system to manage this could be seen as a lack of diligence and a criminal prosecution could occur (UK Instrument 2012 N. 3032 section 39 Penalties).

RoHS 2 also has a more dynamic approach to exemptions, creating an automatic expiration if exemptions are not renewed by requests from industry. Additionally new substances can be added to the controlled list, with 4 new substances expected to be controlled by 2019. All these mean greater information control and update systems are required.

Other differences include new responsibilities for importers and distributors and markings to improve traceability to the technical files. These are part of the NLF for directives and make the supply chain a more active part of the policing (Directive 2011/65/EU Articles 7, 9, 10).

There has been a recent additional amendment 2017/2102 to 2011/65

=== 2015/863 (RoHS 2 amendment) ===
The RoHS 2 directive (2011/65/EU) contains allowance to add new materials and 4 materials are highlighted for this attention in the original version, the amendment 2015/863 adds four additional substances to Annex II of 2011/65/EU (3/4 of the new restrictions are recommended for investigation in the original directive, ref Para 10 of preamble). This is another reason that simple component RoHS compliance statements are not acceptable as compliance requirements vary depending on the date the product is placed on the market (ref IEC 63000:2016). The additional four substances restriction and evidence requirements shall be applied for products placed on the market on or after 22 July 2019 except where exemptions permit as stated in Annex III., although at the time of writing no exemptions exist or have been applied for, for these materials. The four additional substances are

1. Bis(2-Ethylhexyl) phthalate (DEHP)
2. Benzyl butyl phthalate (BBP)
3. Dibutyl phthalate (DBP)
4. Diisobutyl phthalate (DIBP)

The maximum permitted concentrations in non-exempt products are 0.1%.

The new substances are also listed under the REACH Candidate list, and DEHP is not authorised for manufacturing (use as a substance) in the EU under Annex XIV of REACH.

== Scope exclusions ==
With the recast of the original RoHS (I) Directive (2002/95/EC), the scope of the directive was decoupled from the scope of the WEEE Directive and an open scope was introduced. The RoHS (II) Directive (2011/65/EU) was applicable to all electrical and electronic equipment. Scope limitations and exclusions were specifically introduced in Article 2(4) a) – j) of the recast Directive. All other EEE was in scope of the Directive, unless specific exemptions have been granted through Commission delegated acts (see next paragraph).

The scope exclusions are listed below

This Directive does not apply to:

1. equipment which is necessary for the protection of the essential interests of the security of Member States, including arms, munitions and war material intended for specifically military purposes;
2. equipment designed to be sent into space;
3. equipment which is specifically designed, and is to be installed, as part of another type of equipment that is excluded or does not fall within the scope of this Directive, which can fulfil its function only if it is part of that equipment, and which can be replaced only by the same specifically designed equipment;
4. large-scale stationary industrial tools;
5. large-scale fixed installations;
6. means of transport for persons or goods, excluding electric two-wheel vehicles which are not type-approved;
7. non-road mobile machinery made available exclusively for professional use;
8. active implantable medical devices;
9. photovoltaic panels intended to be used in a system that is designed, assembled and installed by professionals for permanent use at a defined location to produce energy from solar light for public, commercial, industrial and residential applications;
10. equipment specifically designed solely for the purposes of research and development only made available on a business-to-business basis.

== Restriction exemptions ==
There are over 80 exemptions, some of which are quite broad. Exemptions will automatically expire after 5 or 7 years unless renewed.

According to Hewlett-Packard: "The European Union is gradually narrowing the scope of and expiring many of the current RoHS exemptions. In addition, it is likely that new substance restrictions will be introduced in the next several years."

Some exemptions:

- Lead as an alloying element in steel containing up to 0.35% lead by weight, aluminium containing up to 0.4% lead by weight, and copper alloy containing up to 4% lead by weight is permitted. (Category 6c)
- Lead in high melting temperature type solders (i.e. lead-based solder alloys containing 85% or more lead by weight). (Category 7a)
- "Lead in solders for servers, storage and storage array systems, network infrastructure equipment for switching, transmission, and network management for telecommunications." (Category 7b)
- Limited amounts of mercury in fluorescent and other light bulbs where it is essential to their functioning comprise RoHS 2 Categories 1, 2, 3, and 4

Medical devices were exempt in the original directive. RoHS 2 narrowed the exemption's scope to active implantable medical devices only (Category 4h). In vitro diagnostic devices (IVDD) and other medical devices are now included.

Automotive vehicles are exempt (Category 4f). Vehicles instead are addressed in the End of Life Vehicles Directive (Directive 2000/53/EC).

== Detecting RoHS Compounds with XRF ==
X-Ray Fluorescence (XRF) helps detect hazardous substances restricted under the RoHS directive. It identifies heavy metals like lead, mercury, and cadmium quickly and efficiently. XRF works best for inorganic elements, making it a popular tool for compliance testing.

=== How XRF Works ===
XRF uses X-rays to excite atoms in a sample. When atoms stabilize, they release energy as photons. The device measures this energy to identify elements in the sample. Each element emits a unique energy, allowing precise detection. XRF creates an energy spectrum showing what elements are present and how much of each exists. This data supports both qualitative and quantitative analysis.

=== XRF for RoHS Testing ===
XRF effectively detects key RoHS-restricted elements like lead, mercury, and cadmium. It can also find chromium but cannot tell if it's hexavalent chromium. Additional tests are necessary for that. However, XRF cannot analyze organic compounds such as phthalates or PBBs. XRF can detect total bromine which works as a pre-screening method. However, these substances require other methods like gas chromatography-mass spectrometry (GC-MS) for precise detection.

XRF offers many advantages. It's fast and non-destructive, meaning samples remain intact after analysis. It works well for solid materials with minimal preparation, saving time and reducing costs. Handheld XRF devices allow on-site testing, making them useful in industrial and environmental settings. These devices analyze samples in seconds, increasing efficiency.

=== Limits of XRF ===
XRF struggles to detect light elements like carbon or oxygen. It also cannot analyze molecules or organic substances. Despite these limits, XRF remains a top choice for detecting heavy metals and ensuring compliance with environmental regulations like RoHS.

== Labeling and documentation ==
The CE logo

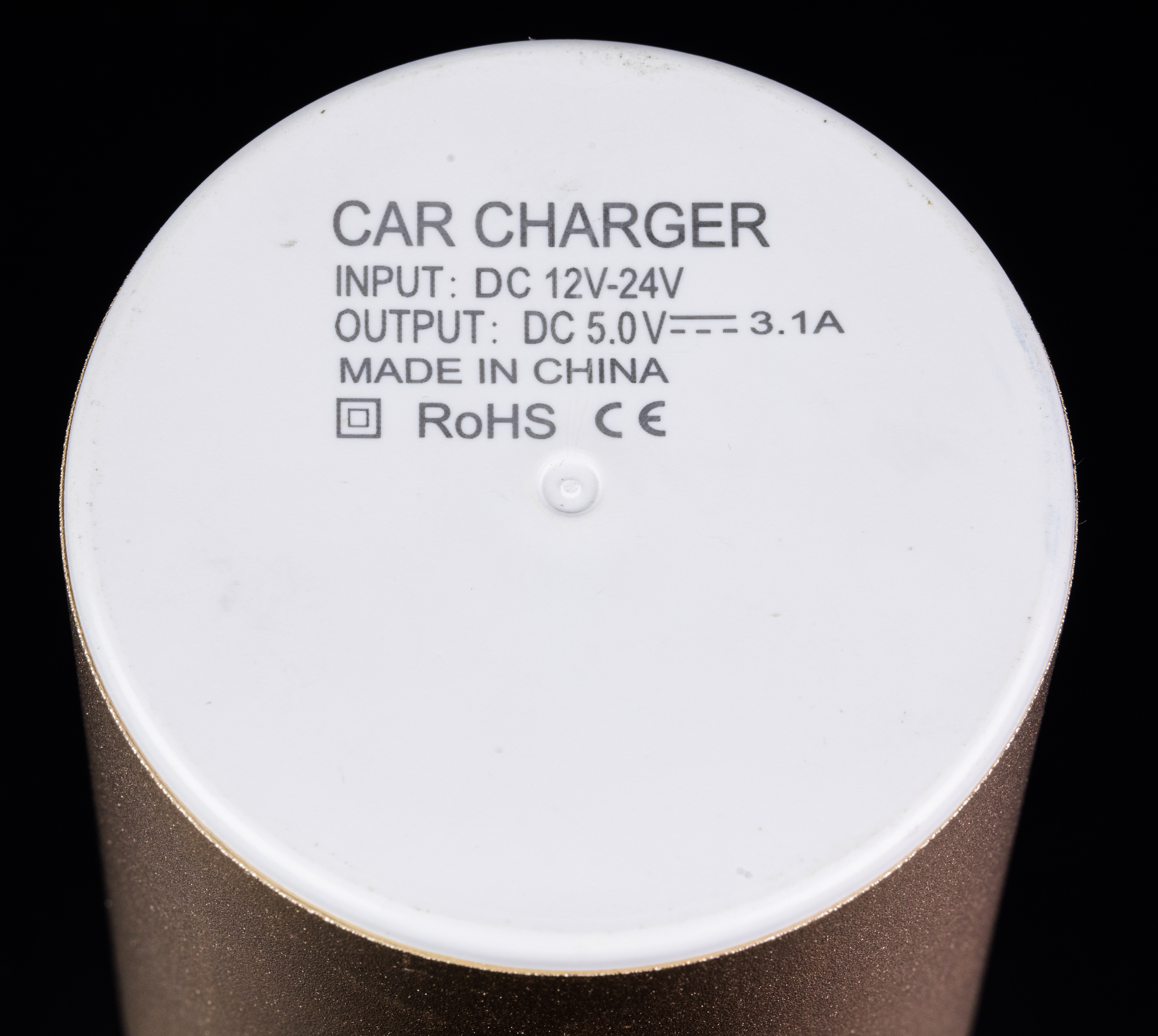
RoHS and CE mark on a car charger

Products within scope of the RoHS 2 directive must display the CE mark, the manufacturers name and address and a serial or batch number. Parties needing to know more detailed compliance information can find this on the EU Declaration of Conformity for the product as created by the manufacturer (Brand owner) responsible for the design or the EU representative. The regulation also requires most actors in the supply chain for the product (importer and distributors) to keep and check this document, as well as ensuring a conformance process has been followed and the correct language translation for instructions are provided. The manufacturer must keep certain documentation to demonstrate conformity, known as a technical file or technical records. The directive requires the manufacturer to demonstrate conformity by the use of test data for all materials or by following a harmonised standard (IEC 63000:2016 is the only standard at the time of writing). Regulators may request this file or, more likely, specific data from it as it will likely be very large.

=== History ===
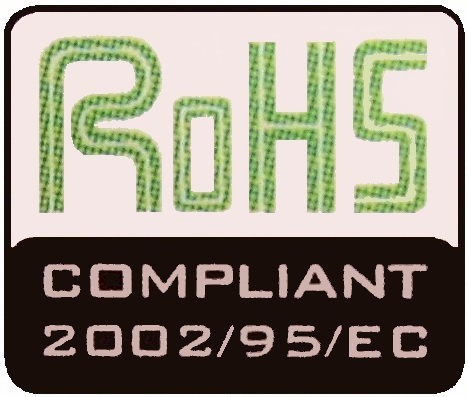
A RoHS mark

RoHS did not require any specific product labelling, but many manufacturers have adopted their own compliance marks to reduce confusion. Visual indicators have included explicit "RoHS compliant" labels, green leaves, check marks, and "PB-Free" markings. Chinese RoHS labels, a lower case "e" within a circle with arrows, can also imply compliance.

The WEEE directive logo

RoHS 2 attempts to address this issue by requiring the aforementioned CE mark whose use is policed by the Trading Standards enforcement agency. It states that the only permitted indication of RoHS compliance is the CE mark. The closely related WEEE (Waste Electrical and Electronic Equipment Directive), which became law simultaneously with RoHS, depicts a waste-can logo with an "X" through it and often accompanies the CE mark.

== Future possible additions ==
New substance restrictions being considered for introduction in the next few years include phthalates, brominated flame retardants (BFRs), chlorinated flame retardants (CFRs), and PVC.

== Other regions ==
=== Asia / Pacific ===
China Order No. 39
Final Measures for the Administration of the Control and Electronic Information Products (often referred to as China RoHS) has the stated intent to establish similar restrictions, but in fact takes a very different approach. Unlike EU RoHS, where products in specified categories are included unless specifically excluded, there will be a list of included products, known as the catalogue – see Article 18 of the regulation – which will be a subset of the total scope of Electronic Information Products, or EIPs, to which the regulations apply. Initially, products that fall under the covered scope must provide markings and disclosure as to the presence of certain substances, while the substances themselves are not (yet) prohibited. There are some products that are EIPs, which are not in scope for EU RoHS, e.g. radar systems, semiconductor-manufacturing equipment, photomasks, etc. The list of EIPs is available in Chinese and English. The marking and disclosure aspects of the regulation were intended to take effect on 1 July 2006, but were postponed twice to 1 March 2007. There is no timeline for the catalogue yet.
Japan
Japan does not have any direct legislation dealing with the RoHS substances, but its recycling laws have spurred Japanese manufacturers to move to a lead-free process in accordance with RoHS guidelines. A ministerial ordinance Japanese industrial standard for Marking of Specific Chemical Substances (J-MOSS), effective from 1 July 2006, directs that some electronic products exceeding a specified amount of the nominated toxic substances must carry a warning label.
South Korea
South Korea promulgated the Act for Resource Recycling of Electrical and Electronic Equipment and Vehicles on 2 April 2007. This regulation has aspects of RoHS, WEEE, and ELV.

=== United States ===
The Consumer Product Safety Act was enacted in 1972 followed by the Consumer Product Safety Improvement Act in 2008.

California has passed the Electronic Waste Recycling Act of 2003 (EWRA). This law prohibits the sale of electronic devices after 1 January 2007, that are prohibited from being sold under the EU RoHS directive, but across a much narrower scope that includes LCDs, CRTs, and the like and only covers the four heavy metals restricted by RoHS. EWRA also has a restricted material disclosure requirement.

Effective 1 January 2010, the California Lighting Efficiency and Toxics Reduction Act applies RoHS to general purpose lights, i.e. "lamps, bulbs, tubes, or other electric devices that provide functional illumination for indoor residential, indoor commercial, and outdoor use."

=== Canada ===
Canada does not have a dedicated national regulation equivalent to the European Union's Restriction of Hazardous Substances (RoHS) Directive. However, certain environmental and product safety regulations align with RoHS principles by controlling or restricting the use of hazardous substances in electrical and electronic equipment. At the federal level, the Canadian Environmental Protection Act, 1999 (CEPA) governs the assessment and management of chemical substances, including those restricted under RoHS, such as lead, cadmium, and mercury. Specific regulations under CEPA, such as the Prohibition of Certain Toxic Substances Regulations, limit or prohibit the manufacture, use, and import of several RoHS-relevant substances.

=== United Kingdom ===
On 31 January 2020, the United Kingdom completed its withdrawal from the European Union and subsequently entered a transition phase spanning from 1 February to 31 December 2020. This event is commonly referred to as Brexit. During this transitional period, the United Kingdom conducted a comprehensive assessment of various regulations, including RoHS. UK RoHS stays well aligned with EU RoHS, with similar scopes, restricted substances, thresholds, and exemptions.

=== Ireland ===
Worldwide standards and certification are available under the QC 080000 standard, governed by the National Standards Authority of Ireland, to ensure the control of hazardous substances in industrial applications.

=== Sweden ===
In 2012 Sweden's Chemicals Agency (Kemi) and Electrical Safety Authority tested 63 consumer electronics products and found that 12 were out of compliance. Kemi claims that this is similar to testing results from prior years. "Eleven products contained prohibited levels of lead, and one of polybrominated diphenyl ether flame retardants. Details of seven companies have been passed to Swedish prosecutors. Kemi says that levels of non-compliance with RoHS are similar to previous years, and remain too high."

== Other standards ==
RoHS is not the only environmental standard of which electronic product developers should be aware. Manufacturers will find that it is cheaper to have only a single bill of materials for a product that is distributed worldwide, instead of customising the product to fit each country's specific environmental laws. Therefore, they develop their own standards, which allow only the strictest of all allowable substances.

For example, IBM forces each of their suppliers to complete a Product Content Declaration form to document compliance to their environmental standard 'Baseline Environmental Requirements for Materials, Parts and Products for IBM Logo Hardware Products'. Thus, IBM banned DecaBDE, even though there was formerly a RoHS exemption for this material (overturned by the European Court in 2008).

Similarly, here is Hewlett-Packard's environmental standard.

== Criticism ==
Adverse effects on product quality and reliability, plus high cost of compliance (especially to small business) are cited as criticisms of the directive, as well as early research indicating that the life cycle benefits of lead-free solder versus traditional solder materials are mixed.

Criticism earlier on came from an industry resistant to change and a misunderstanding of solders and soldering processes. Deliberate misinformation was espoused to resist what was perceived as a "non-tariff barrier created by European bureaucrats." Many believe the industry is stronger now through this experience and has a better understanding of the science and technologies involved.

One criticism of RoHS is that the restriction of lead and cadmium does not address some of their most prolific applications, while being costly for the electronics industry to comply with. Specifically, the total lead used in electronics makes up only 2% of world lead consumption, while 90% of lead is used for batteries (covered by the battery directive, as mentioned above, which requires recycling and limits the use of mercury and cadmium, but does not restrict lead). Another criticism is that less than 4% of lead in landfills is due to electronic components or circuit boards, while approximately 36% is due to leaded glass in cathode-ray tube monitors and televisions, which can contain up to 2 kg per screen. This study was done right after the tech boom.

The more common lead-free solder systems have a higher melting point, e.g. a 30 °C typical difference for tin-silver-copper alloys, but wave soldering temperatures are approximately the same at ~255 °C; however at this temperature most typical lead-free solders have longer wetting times than eutectic Pb/Sn (lead/tin) 37:63 solder. Additionally wetting force is typically lower, which can be disadvantageous (for hole filling), but advantageous in other situations (closely spaced components).

Care must be taken in selection of RoHS solders as some formulations are harder with less ductility, increasing the likelihood of cracks instead of plastic deformation, which is typical for lead-containing solders. Cracks can occur due to thermal or mechanical forces acting on components or the circuit board, the former being more common during manufacturing and the latter in the field. RoHS solders exhibit advantages and disadvantages in these respects, dependent on packaging and formulation.

The editor of Conformity Magazine wondered in 2005 if the transition to lead-free solder would affect long-term reliability of electronic devices and systems, especially in applications more mission-critical than in consumer products, citing possible breaches due to other environmental factors like oxidation. The 2005 Farnell/Newark InOne "RoHS Legislation and Technical Manual", cites these and other "lead-free" solder issues, such as:

1. Warping or delamination of printed circuit boards;
2. Damage to through-holes, ICs and components on circuit boards; and,
3. Added moisture sensitivity, all of which may compromise quality and reliability.

=== Effect on reliability ===
Potential reliability concerns were addressed in Annex item #7 of the RoHS directive, granting some specific exemptions from regulation until 2010. These issues were raised when the directive was first implemented in 2003 and reliability effects were less known.

Another potential problem that some lead-free, high tin-based solders may face is the growth of tin whiskers. These thin strands of tin can grow and make contact with an adjacent trace, developing a short circuit. Lead in the solder suppresses the growth of tin whiskers. Historically tin whiskers have been associated with a handful of failures, including a nuclear power plant shutdown, satellite failure and pacemaker incident where pure tin plating was used. However, these failures pre-date RoHS. They also do not involve consumer electronics, and therefore may employ RoHS-restricted substances if desired. Manufacturers of electronic equipment for mission-critical aerospace applications have followed a policy of caution and therefore resisted the adoption of lead-free solders.

To help mitigate potential problems, lead-free manufacturers are using a variety of approaches such as tin-zinc formulations that produce non-conducting whiskers or formulations that reduce growth, although they do not halt growth completely in all circumstances. Fortunately, experience thus far suggests deployed instances of RoHS compliant products are not failing due to whisker growth. Dr. Ronald Lasky of Dartmouth College reports: "RoHS has been in force for more than 15 months now, and ~$400B RoHS-compliant products have been produced. With all of these products in the field, no significant numbers of tin whisker-related failures have been reported." Whisker growth occurs slowly over time, is unpredictable, and not fully understood, so time may be the only true test of these efforts. Whisker growth is even observable for lead-based solders, albeit on a much smaller scale.

Some countries have exempted medical and telecommunication infrastructure products from the legislation. However, this may be a moot point, since as electronic component manufacturers convert their production lines to producing only lead-free parts, conventional parts with eutectic tin-lead solder will simply not be available, even for military, aerospace and industrial users. To the extent that only solder is involved, this is at least partially mitigated by many lead-free components' compatibility with lead-containing solder processes. Leadframe-based components, such as Quad Flat Packages (QFP), Small Outline Integrated Circuits (SOIC), and Small outline packages (SOP) with gull wing leads, are generally compatible since the finish on the part leads contributes a small amount of material to the finished joint. However, components such as Ball grid arrays (BGA) which come with lead-free solder balls and leadless parts are often not compatible with lead-containing processes.

=== Economic effect ===
There are no de minimis exemptions, e.g., for micro-businesses. This economic effect was anticipated and at least some attempts at mitigating the effect were made.

Another form of economic effect is the cost of product failures during the switch to RoHS compliance. For example, tin whiskers were responsible for a 5% failure rate in certain components of Swiss Swatch watches in 2006, prior to the July implementation of RoHS, reportedly triggering a US$1 billion recall. Swatch responded to this by applying for an exemption to RoHS compliance, but this was denied.

== Benefits ==
=== Health benefits ===
RoHS helps reduce damage to people and the environment in third-world countries where much of today's "high-tech waste" ends up. The use of lead-free solders and components reduces risks to electronics industry workers in prototype and manufacturing operations. Contact with solder paste no longer represents the same health hazard as it used to.

=== Reliability concerns unfounded ===
Contrary to the predictions of widespread component failure and reduced reliability, RoHS's first anniversary (July 2007) passed with little fanfare. Most contemporary consumer electronics are RoHS compliant. As of 2013, millions of compliant products are in use worldwide.

Many electronics companies keep "RoHS status" pages on their corporate websites. For example, the AMD website states:

Although lead containing solder cannot be completely eliminated from all applications today, AMD engineers have developed effective technical solutions to reduce lead content in microprocessors and chipsets to ensure RoHS compliance while minimizing costs and maintaining product features. There is no change to fit, functional, electrical or performance specifications. Quality and reliability standards for RoHS compliant products are expected to be identical compared to current packages.

RoHS printed circuit board finishing technologies are surpassing traditional formulations in fabrication thermal shock, solder paste printability, contact resistance, and aluminium wire bonding performance and nearing their performance in other attributes.

The properties of lead-free solder, such as its high temperature resilience, has been used to prevent failures under harsh field conditions. These conditions include operating temperatures with test cycles in the range of −40 °C to +150 °C with severe vibration and shock requirements. Automobile manufacturers are turning to RoHS solutions now as electronics move into the engine bay.

=== Flow properties and assembly ===
One of the major differences between lead-containing and lead-free solder pastes is the "flow" of the solder in its liquid state. Lead-containing solder has a lower surface tension, and tends to move slightly to attach itself to exposed metal surfaces that touch any part of the liquid solder. Lead-free solder conversely tends to stay in place where it is in its liquid state, and attaches itself to exposed metal surfaces only where the liquid solder touches it.

This lack of "flow" – while typically seen as a disadvantage because it can lead to lower quality electrical connections – can be used to place components more tightly than they used to be placed due to the properties of lead-containing solders.

For example, Motorola reports that their new RoHS wireless device assembly techniques are "...enabling a smaller, thinner, lighter unit." Their Motorola Q phone would not have been possible without the new solder. The lead-free solder allows for tighter pad spacing.

=== Some exempt products achieve compliance ===
Research into new alloys and technologies is allowing companies to release RoHS products that are currently exempt from compliance, e.g. computer servers. IBM has announced a RoHS solution for high lead solder joints once thought to remain a permanent exemption. The lead-free packaging technology "...offers economical advantages in relation to traditional bumping processes, such as solder waste reduction, use of bulk alloys, quicker time-to-market for products and a much lower chemical usage rate."

Test and measurement vendors, such as National Instruments, have also started to produce RoHS-compliant products, despite devices in this category being exempt from the RoHS directive.

== See also ==
- REACH
- Battery Directive
- Electronic waste
- Green computing
- Ion attachment mass spectrometry – used to enforce RoHS limits on banned substances
- Lead safe work practices in the US
- List of European Union directives
- Waste Electrical and Electronic Equipment Directive
