= M21 =

M21 or M-21 may refer to:

== Transportation ==
- M21 (New York City bus), a New York City Bus route in Manhattan
- M-21 (Michigan highway), a road connecting Flint and Grand Rapids
- M21 (East London), a Metropolitan Route in East London, South Africa
- M21 (Pretoria), a Metropolitan Route in Pretoria, South Africa
- M21 (Durban), a Metropolitan Route in Durban, South Africa
- Highway M21 (Ukraine)

== Military ==
- HMS M21, Royal Navy M15 class monitor; sunk in 1918
- M21 mine, an American circular anti-tank landmine
- M21 Sniper Weapon System, a sniper rifle based on the M14 rifle
- Zastava M21, a Serbian assault rifle
- Lockheed M-21, a variant of the Lockheed A-12 and the carrier aircraft for the Lockheed D-21
- M21 mortar motor carriage , a half-track carrying an 81 mm mortar

== Other ==
- BMW M21, a 1983 2.4 L diesel straight-6 engine
- MSrE M-21, Hungarian aerobatics aircraft
- Lockheed M-21, an American reconnaissance drone carrier aircraft
- MacGregor 21, an American sailboat design
- Messier 21, an open star cluster in the constellation Sagittarius
- Proton Putra, car model sold in Australia as Proton M21
- M21, a postcode district for an area of south Manchester, see M postcode area
- McLaren M21, a Formula Two racing car
- Samsung Galaxy M21, a mid-range Android-based smartphone by Samsung
