= Lead safe work practices =

Mandated by the United States Department of Housing and Urban Development (HUD) standard 24 CFR Part 1330 (a) (4), Lead-Safe Work Practices provide those performing remodeling tasks in homes built before 1978 with guidelines on procedures they should be using to prevent creating a lead hazard.

Lead poisoning remains a major environmental health concern, and while we most often associate the disease with childhood, high levels of lead exposure are linked to serious adult health conditions, such as high blood pressure and dementia.

Workers who remodel or renovate older homes where the likelihood of lead paint is high are particularly vulnerable to lead exposure. Their work creates contaminated dust which they then inhale. They can also put their families at risk by bringing contaminated dust home on their work clothes.

The National Safety Council emphasizes that everyone should be aware of the potential presence of lead paint in homes built prior to 1978, and notes that…”such awareness is particularly important for those engaged in the building trades, as well as do-it-yourselfers, to learn how to perform their work in a lead-safe manner.”

Effective April 22, 2010, under its Renovation, Repair, and Painting (RRP) Rule, the EPA mandates that firms performing renovation, repair, and painting projects that disturb lead-based paint in pre-1978 homes, child care facilities, and schools be certified by the EPA and that they use certified renovators who are trained by EPA-approved training providers to follow lead-safe work practices. Individuals can become certified renovators by taking an approved training course.

Anyone performing RRP projects in pre-1978 homes and child-occupied facilities, must learn how to use lead-safe work practices and follow these three simple procedures:

- Contain the work area.
- Minimize dust.
- Clean up thoroughly.

== See also ==
- Health care in the United States
- Restriction of Hazardous Substances Directive (RoHS) in the EU
- Workers protected by OSHA Lead Regulationshttps://www.osha.gov/SLTC/lead/construction.html
