= Bitter Harvest (1981 film) =

1981 television film directed by Roger Young

- Genre: Drama
- Based on: Bitter Harvest by Frederic and Sandra Halbert
- Written by: Richard Friedenberg
- Directed by: Roger Young
- Starring: Ron Howard; Art Carney; Tarah Nutter; Richard Dysart
- Composer: Fred Karlin
- Country of origin: United States
- Original language: English

Production
- Executive producer: Charles Fries
- Producer: Tony Ganz
- Cinematography: Gayne Rescher
- Editor: Thomas Fries
- Running time: 94 minutes
- Production company: Charles Fries Productions

Original release
- Network: NBC
- Release: May 4, 1981

Bitter Harvest is a 1981 American drama television film directed by Roger Young, from a teleplay by Richard Friedenberg, based on the 1978 book of the same name by Frederic and Sandra Halbert. The film stars Ron Howard, Art Carney, Tarah Nutter, and Richard Dysart, and chronicles the Michigan PBB contamination incident.

Bitter Harvest originally aired on NBC in the United States on May 4, 1981. The film received positive reviews and was nominated for four Primetime Emmy Awards.

The film marked one of Ron Howard's last major acting roles before he transitioned into a full-time film director.

== Plot ==
Ned De Vries is a Michigan dairy farmer, a young ambitious man with a wife and family, but he has a problem. His cattle are getting sick.

De Vries calls the local veterinary authorities from the Michigan Farm Bureau (MFB) who study his animals, take samples, and kill a small ailing calf to take the remains for autopsy. Judging from the results, they claim he is responsible for his problem. De Vries claims to have been feeding his livestock only on the recommended protein-enriched feeds, commonly marketed across the state by Michigan Farm Bureau Services. After scouring his pastures for signs of contaminants and studying his livestock to try to explain their symptoms, De Vries finds a nest of dead rats, and his own brief examination shows they all had symptoms similar to his cattle. The nest, like the rats, is full of cattle feed.

When he presents his findings to the MFB veterinarians, they pay no regard to his claims or fears that the feed might be poisoned, leaving him frustrated in his search for an answer. His first thoughts that the rats may be pointing to the problem fades when his family, who do not eat cattle feed, begin showing signs of skin complaints, headaches and feeling generally unwell. De Vries makes an impassioned plea to one of the MFB's lab technicians who wrote the report on his livestock. After some urging the man provides information that may help. The farm samples were tested by gas chromatography, the tests being run for several hours. By mistake, one of the tests was allowed to run all night long. Toward the end of this long print-out a single unidentified blip appeared on the result chart, showing an unknown substance in the calf's tissues. Unable to help further, the technician gives De Vries the charts and points him in the direction of Dr. Morton Freeman, a respected scientist and researcher.

Dr. Freeman responds to De Vries' request for help and identifies the blip on the chart as polybrominated biphenyl (PBB), a flame retardant used in Firemaster extinguishers. At last the answer is in his hands.

Dr. Freeman visits him with further information, following further research into PBBs. Exposure symptoms match what they already know, and include memory loss and possible cancer. They find that the substance that has poisoned his livestock can be passed on to humans by eating beef and drinking milk. This is clearly shown by his family's poor health. His wife can no longer breast feed her baby, as that too would pass on any PBB she has in her body. The substance is stored in body fat and is cumulative. It's firmly in the food chain, and the long-term effects are uncertain, as there is no known way to remove PBB once it has been ingested.

After being met with skepticism for so long, De Vries finds he is now bogged down in bureaucratic inertia, even with the support of Dr. Freeman and his findings. He travels the state in his spare time, gathering all the information he can about the spread of the contaminant. He finds another farmer like himself, dispirited and without hope after a long struggle with the MFB and official policy. He too has lost cattle and his family is also in poor health; and he has carried the burden of guilt that he is somehow directly responsible for all that has happened to him.

The source of the contamination is revealed as the film draws to its close. In the MFB mill near Battle Creek, Michigan, the proteins that are added to animal feed, and the chemicals (PBB) used in fire retardant, are being stored in identically colored paper sacks, on pallets placed side by side. No one can tell at a glance which is which, and it becomes evident that they could easily have been switched in error.

The film concludes a year after the initial outbreak, with the killing of De Vries' entire herd, as the animals are led into a deep open pit, shot, and bulldozed over with soil.

== Cast ==
- Ron Howard as Ned De Vries
- Art Carney as Walter Peary
- Tarah Nutter as Kate De Vries
- David Knell as Brandon
- Barry Corbin as Dr. Agajanian
- Richard Dysart as Dr. Morton Freeman
- Michael Bond as DeJong
- Jim Haynie as Doc
- Robert Hirschfeld as Harold
- G. W. Bailey as Lazlo
- Robert Behling as Art
- Ken Hixon as Williams
- Dwight Schultz as Schlatter
- Joe Miksak as Al

== Awards and nominations ==
Year	Award	Category	Nominee	Result	Ref.
1982	33rd Primetime Creative Arts Emmy Awards	Outstanding Cinematography for a Limited Series or a Special	Gayne Rescher	Nominated	
1982	33rd Primetime Creative Arts Emmy Awards	Outstanding Film Editing for a Limited Series or a Special	Thomas Fries	Nominated	
1982	33rd Primetime Emmy Awards	Outstanding Directing in a Limited Series or a Special	Roger Young	Nominated	
1982	33rd Primetime Emmy Awards	Outstanding Writing in a Limited Series or a Special	Richard Friedenberg	Nominated	
1982	8th Humanitas Awards	90 Minute or Longer Network or Syndicated Television	Richard Friedenberg	Nominated	
1982	34th Writers Guild of America Awards	Best Anthology Drama Adapted	Richard Friedenberg	Won	
