= Jeffrey Weidenhamer =

Jeffrey D. Weidenhamer is a Trustees’ Distinguished Professor at Ashland University and professor of chemistry. He is also chair of the department of chemistry, geology and physics and a member of the environmental science faculty.

Weidenhamer has a bachelor's degree from Ashland University, master's degrees from Ohio State University and Louisiana State University and a Ph.D. from the University of South Florida.
