= Polybrominated biphenyl =

Group of chemical compounds

Structure of polybrominated biphenyls

Polybrominated biphenyls (PBBs), also called brominated biphenyls or polybromobiphenyls, are a group of manufactured chemicals that consist of polyhalogenated derivatives of a biphenyl core. Their chlorine analogs are the PCBs. While once widely used commercially, PBBs are now controlled substances under the Restriction of Hazardous Substances Directive, which limits their use in electrical and electronic products sold in the EU.

== Classes of PBBs ==
The family of PBBs consists of 209 possible substances, which are called congeners (PBB = C_{12}H_{(10−x)}Br_{x} (x = 1, 2, ..., 10 = m + n)). The number of isomers for mono-, di-, tri-, tetra-, penta-, hexa-, hepta-, octa-, nona-, and decabromobiphenyl are 3, 12, 24, 42, 46, 42, 24, 12, 3 and 1, respectively.

Number	Formula	Name	CAS Number	InChIKey
PBB-1	C_{12}H_{9}Br	2-bromobiphenyl	2052-07-5	KTADSLDAUJLZGL-UHFFFAOYSA-N
PBB-2	C_{12}H_{9}Br	3-bromobiphenyl	2113-57-7	USYQKCQEVBFJRP-UHFFFAOYSA-N
PBB-3	C_{12}H_{9}Br	4-bromobiphenyl	92-66-0	PKJBWOWQJHHAHG-UHFFFAOYSA-N
PBB-4	C_{12}H_{8}Br_{2}	2,2'-dibromobiphenyl	13029-09-9	DRKHIWKXLZCAKP-UHFFFAOYSA-N
PBB-5	C_{12}H_{8}Br_{2}	2,3-dibromobiphenyl	115245-06-2	ODVMOIOUMCXTPS-UHFFFAOYSA-N
PBB-6	C_{12}H_{8}Br_{2}	2,3'-dibromobiphenyl	49602-90-6	QNZTUODKOQEMNY-UHFFFAOYSA-N
PBB-7	C_{12}H_{8}Br_{2}	2,4-dibromobiphenyl	53592-10-2	BWVLLEHUUJBZMR-UHFFFAOYSA-N
PBB-8	C_{12}H_{8}Br_{2}	2,4'-dibromobiphenyl	49602-91-7	FPYGQQPAMXFHJF-UHFFFAOYSA-N
PBB-9	C_{12}H_{8}Br_{2}	2,5-dibromobiphenyl	57422-77-2	MHQCPXUMZCNOSF-UHFFFAOYSA-N
PBB-10	C_{12}H_{8}Br_{2}	2,6-dibromobiphenyl	59080-32-9	KCYUDWBWEGNDFO-UHFFFAOYSA-N
PBB-11	C_{12}H_{8}Br_{2}	3,3'-dibromobiphenyl	16400-51-4	LPLLWKZDMKTEMV-UHFFFAOYSA-N
PBB-12	C_{12}H_{8}Br_{2}	3,4-dibromobiphenyl	60108-72-7	XIQSOBZINJQGKX-UHFFFAOYSA-N
PBB-13	C_{12}H_{8}Br_{2}	3,4'-dibromobiphenyl	57186-90-0	DLAKCVTXQRIHEY-UHFFFAOYSA-N
PBB-14	C_{12}H_{8}Br_{2}	3,5-dibromobiphenyl	16372-96-6	HIHYAKDOWUFGBK-UHFFFAOYSA-N
PBB-15	C_{12}H_{8}Br_{2}	4,4'-dibromobiphenyl	92-86-4	HQJQYILBCQPYBI-UHFFFAOYSA-N
PBB-16	C_{12}H_{7}Br_{3}	2,2',3-tribromobiphenyl	2181002-36-6	ZMAJHJFKZRYSPS-UHFFFAOYSA-N
PBB-17	C_{12}H_{7}Br_{3}	2,2',4-tribromobiphenyl	144978-90-5	YDNHQROTGQCGTC-UHFFFAOYSA-N
PBB-18	C_{12}H_{7}Br_{3}	2,2',5-tribromobiphenyl	59080-34-1	IYDNWMCMGNRWET-UHFFFAOYSA-N
PBB-19	C_{12}H_{7}Br_{3}	2,2',6-tribromobiphenyl	507241-82-9	KGVYWUFWUAWULV-UHFFFAOYSA-N
PBB-20	C_{12}H_{7}Br_{3}	2,3,3'-tribromobiphenyl	2181002-37-7	VUIHSFUQTRKWCC-UHFFFAOYSA-N
PBB-21	C_{12}H_{7}Br_{3}	2,3,4-tribromobiphenyl	855255-46-8	MKDZJIHLRSIZOV-UHFFFAOYSA-N
PBB-22	C_{12}H_{7}Br_{3}	2,3,4'-tribromobiphenyl	945669-02-3	UWLOLOPLLABBEZ-UHFFFAOYSA-N
PBB-23	C_{12}H_{7}Br_{3}	2,3,5-tribromobiphenyl	2181002-38-8	WONJQKRUOVCHJT-UHFFFAOYSA-N
PBB-24	C_{12}H_{7}Br_{3}	2,3,6-tribromobiphenyl	2181002-39-9	XBITUJKYHPKZLM-UHFFFAOYSA-N
PBB-25	C_{12}H_{7}Br_{3}	2,3',4-tribromobiphenyl	144978-86-9	DMFDJINIFGGINS-UHFFFAOYSA-N
PBB-26	C_{12}H_{7}Br_{3}	2,3',5-tribromobiphenyl	59080-35-2	HSYRZFKOZZOCNA-UHFFFAOYSA-N
PBB-27	C_{12}H_{7}Br_{3}	2,3',6-tribromobiphenyl	2181002-40-2	CCUGKUREKNKRFL-UHFFFAOYSA-N
PBB-28	C_{12}H_{7}Br_{3}	2,4,4'-tribromobiphenyl	6430-90-6	VALVUQTWSYUYTO-UHFFFAOYSA-N
PBB-29	C_{12}H_{7}Br_{3}	2,4,5-tribromobiphenyl	115245-07-3	BNBROTCWKGRRKT-UHFFFAOYSA-N
PBB-30	C_{12}H_{7}Br_{3}	2,4,6-tribromobiphenyl	59080-33-0	YCLZBYQDXVJFII-UHFFFAOYSA-N
PBB-31	C_{12}H_{7}Br_{3}	2,4',5-tribromobiphenyl	59080-36-3	VQAOFEQEGKHRBC-UHFFFAOYSA-N
PBB-32	C_{12}H_{7}Br_{3}	2,4',6-tribromobiphenyl	64258-03-3	BCWVIZFLJCJGPL-UHFFFAOYSA-N
PBB-33	C_{12}H_{7}Br_{3}	2,3',4'-tribromobiphenyl	859930-83-9	XRMQKMIQBMLPND-UHFFFAOYSA-N
PBB-34	C_{12}H_{7}Br_{3}	2,3',5'-tribromobiphenyl	855255-45-7	GLMOTTNMEOGAIT-UHFFFAOYSA-N
PBB-35	C_{12}H_{7}Br_{3}	3,3',4-tribromobiphenyl	2181002-41-3	QVGDNYQXPUJRTR-UHFFFAOYSA-N
PBB-36	C_{12}H_{7}Br_{3}	3,3',5-tribromobiphenyl	855255-44-6	IJCXDTWVECJMMQ-UHFFFAOYSA-N
PBB-37	C_{12}H_{7}Br_{3}	3,4,4'-tribromobiphenyl	6683-35-8	BYQYWRHKDIPDTI-UHFFFAOYSA-N
PBB-38	C_{12}H_{7}Br_{3}	3,4,5-tribromobiphenyl	115245-08-4	GHSQRJGOIOSWQL-UHFFFAOYSA-N
PBB-39	C_{12}H_{7}Br_{3}	3,4',5-tribromobiphenyl	72416-87-6	PMLLBFUHDNYTAP-UHFFFAOYSA-N
PBB-40	C_{12}H_{6}Br_{4}	2,2',3,3'-tetrabromobiphenyl	2181002-42-4	IYBWSZOVXDTAGU-UHFFFAOYSA-N
PBB-41	C_{12}H_{6}Br_{4}	2,2',3,4-tetrabromobiphenyl	2181002-43-5	RGUJAUYFSYHLLZ-UHFFFAOYSA-N
PBB-42	C_{12}H_{6}Br_{4}	2,2',3,4'-tetrabromobiphenyl	2181002-44-6	VFAUZXZIDJNPER-UHFFFAOYSA-N
PBB-43	C_{12}H_{6}Br_{4}	2,2',3,5-tetrabromobiphenyl	2181002-45-7	KPUJGMZNJJOGGY-UHFFFAOYSA-N
PBB-44	C_{12}H_{6}Br_{4}	2,2',3,5'-tetrabromobiphenyl	2181002-46-8	XTUJMVPCQQSNMQ-UHFFFAOYSA-N
PBB-45	C_{12}H_{6}Br_{4}	2,2',3,6-tetrabromobiphenyl	NOCAS_1044776	FZXAACUNMFLDLM-UHFFFAOYSA-N
PBB-46	C_{12}H_{6}Br_{4}	2,2',3,6'-tetrabromobiphenyl	2181002-47-9	UQJZFNNCGNMWFD-UHFFFAOYSA-N
PBB-47	C_{12}H_{6}Br_{4}	2,2',4,4'-tetrabromobiphenyl	66115-57-9	UBJWRBZIWNERQZ-UHFFFAOYSA-N
PBB-48	C_{12}H_{6}Br_{4}	2,2',4,5-tetrabromobiphenyl	958802-46-5	PALAXWMMBSLIDB-UHFFFAOYSA-N
PBB-49	C_{12}H_{6}Br_{4}	2,2',4,5'-tetrabromobiphenyl	60044-24-8	LUASYBWZXWTYKK-UHFFFAOYSA-N
PBB-50	C_{12}H_{6}Br_{4}	2,2',4,6-tetrabromobiphenyl	2181002-48-0	SEBYEYSEKUCCHL-UHFFFAOYSA-N
PBB-51	C_{12}H_{6}Br_{4}	2,2',4,6'-tetrabromobiphenyl	97038-95-4	HFDOVSPQVPECFP-UHFFFAOYSA-N
PBB-52	C_{12}H_{6}Br_{4}	2,2',5,5'-tetrabromobiphenyl	59080-37-4	XEFMFJLRXHQLEM-UHFFFAOYSA-N
PBB-53	C_{12}H_{6}Br_{4}	2,2',5,6'-tetrabromobiphenyl	60044-25-9	IMEYSCIEAFLSQJ-UHFFFAOYSA-N
PBB-54	C_{12}H_{6}Br_{4}	2,2',6,6'-tetrabromobiphenyl	97038-96-5	RAIZQBVLCDNAOH-UHFFFAOYSA-N
PBB-55	C_{12}H_{6}Br_{4}	2,3,3',4-tetrabromobiphenyl	97038-99-8	RFDDLSDJSCDGGB-UHFFFAOYSA-N
PBB-56	C_{12}H_{6}Br_{4}	2,3,3',4'-tetrabromobiphenyl	945669-03-4	GEASNODZMCZDOU-UHFFFAOYSA-N
PBB-57	C_{12}H_{6}Br_{4}	2,3,3',5-tetrabromobiphenyl	2181002-49-1	GOBKLRXNACHGJY-UHFFFAOYSA-N
PBB-58	C_{12}H_{6}Br_{4}	2,3,3',5'-tetrabromobiphenyl	2181002-50-4	UXIVMZDITHSNEY-UHFFFAOYSA-N
PBB-59	C_{12}H_{6}Br_{4}	2,3,3',6-tetrabromobiphenyl	2181002-51-5	IYKSFAUBFLOXHF-UHFFFAOYSA-N
PBB-60	C_{12}H_{6}Br_{4}	2,3,4,4'-tetrabromobiphenyl	855255-52-6	INQSKWNRHXQWCO-UHFFFAOYSA-N
PBB-61	C_{12}H_{6}Br_{4}	2,3,4,5-tetrabromobiphenyl	115245-09-5	NYSAPLQZKHQBSO-UHFFFAOYSA-N
PBB-62	C_{12}H_{6}Br_{4}	2,3,4,6-tetrabromobiphenyl	115245-10-8	XHVQAQZZPWSOSO-UHFFFAOYSA-N
PBB-63	C_{12}H_{6}Br_{4}	2,3,4',5-tetrabromobiphenyl	2181002-52-6	VCNCAHSISZWUNC-UHFFFAOYSA-N
PBB-64	C_{12}H_{6}Br_{4}	2,3,4',6-tetrabromobiphenyl	2181002-53-7	LLQRLLRXFPHQMS-UHFFFAOYSA-N
PBB-65	C_{12}H_{6}Br_{4}	2,3,5,6-tetrabromobiphenyl	2181002-54-8	LOVPZSHTMUXIJK-UHFFFAOYSA-N
PBB-66	C_{12}H_{6}Br_{4}	2,3',4,4'-tetrabromobiphenyl	84303-45-7	CGYRDNFKEDHHMM-UHFFFAOYSA-N
PBB-67	C_{12}H_{6}Br_{4}	2,3',4,5-tetrabromobiphenyl	2181002-55-9	MPLSZDQNQLPUEL-UHFFFAOYSA-N
PBB-68	C_{12}H_{6}Br_{4}	2,3',4,5'-tetrabromobiphenyl	2181002-56-0	NYCMCOPVXHBRIW-UHFFFAOYSA-N
PBB-69	C_{12}H_{6}Br_{4}	2,3',4,6-tetrabromobiphenyl	2181002-57-1	WNMNXWIIIZSMOD-UHFFFAOYSA-N
PBB-70	C_{12}H_{6}Br_{4}	2,3',4',5-tetrabromobiphenyl	59080-38-5	HWUQTZIBVSOXBT-UHFFFAOYSA-N
PBB-71	C_{12}H_{6}Br_{4}	2,3',4',6-tetrabromobiphenyl	2181002-58-2	ANKBNVRAODQPRE-UHFFFAOYSA-N
PBB-72	C_{12}H_{6}Br_{4}	2,3',5,5'-tetrabromobiphenyl	2181002-59-3	FIFQPGGGIPSMLC-UHFFFAOYSA-N
PBB-73	C_{12}H_{6}Br_{4}	2,3',5',6-tetrabromobiphenyl	2181002-60-6	COACTWIPGBJBSQ-UHFFFAOYSA-N
PBB-74	C_{12}H_{6}Br_{4}	2,4,4',5-tetrabromobiphenyl	855255-51-5	SRZVBYKYZSEORN-UHFFFAOYSA-N
PBB-75	C_{12}H_{6}Br_{4}	2,4,4',6-tetrabromobiphenyl	64258-02-2	QOYZOHLNXSXCTO-UHFFFAOYSA-N
PBB-76	C_{12}H_{6}Br_{4}	2,3',4',5'-tetrabromobiphenyl	2181002-61-7	UTEKJEZVGBFSEN-UHFFFAOYSA-N
PBB-77	C_{12}H_{6}Br_{4}	3,3',4,4'-tetrabromobiphenyl	77102-82-0	BVGDXTYHVRFEQZ-UHFFFAOYSA-N
PBB-78	C_{12}H_{6}Br_{4}	3,3',4,5-tetrabromobiphenyl	2181002-62-8	PRMUJPUCDYHFDU-UHFFFAOYSA-N
PBB-79	C_{12}H_{6}Br_{4}	3,3',4,5'-tetrabromobiphenyl	97038-98-7	LCVYPBMOMVFNNO-UHFFFAOYSA-N
PBB-80	C_{12}H_{6}Br_{4}	3,3',5,5'-tetrabromobiphenyl	16400-50-3	FXJXZYWFJAXIJX-UHFFFAOYSA-N
PBB-81	C_{12}H_{6}Br_{4}	3,4,4',5-tetrabromobiphenyl	59589-92-3	BQOPMOAYELIJRL-UHFFFAOYSA-N
PBB-82	C_{12}H_{5}Br_{5}	2,2',3,3',4-pentabromobiphenyl	2181002-63-9	KVAZKLSJZKKRHF-UHFFFAOYSA-N
PBB-83	C_{12}H_{5}Br_{5}	2,2',3,3',5-pentabromobiphenyl	2181002-64-0	WJCWTMCUAPPJEP-UHFFFAOYSA-N
PBB-84	C_{12}H_{5}Br_{5}	2,2',3,3',6-pentabromobiphenyl	2181002-65-1	PJPYYSSYSIGUQQ-UHFFFAOYSA-N
PBB-85	C_{12}H_{5}Br_{5}	2,2',3,4,4'-pentabromobiphenyl	2181002-66-2	DQKSWVXFQQMATR-UHFFFAOYSA-N
PBB-86	C_{12}H_{5}Br_{5}	2,2',3,4,5-pentabromobiphenyl	2181002-67-3	NDDKNJLDHGWLNG-UHFFFAOYSA-N
PBB-87	C_{12}H_{5}Br_{5}	2,2',3,4,5'-pentabromobiphenyl	2181002-68-4	HCQXGYTTXBLRDK-UHFFFAOYSA-N
PBB-88	C_{12}H_{5}Br_{5}	2,2',3,4,6-pentabromobiphenyl	77910-04-4	HFCFSKONCLKHSY-UHFFFAOYSA-N
PBB-89	C_{12}H_{5}Br_{5}	2,2',3,4,6'-pentabromobiphenyl	2181002-69-5	OOFLUQIAQIJJMT-UHFFFAOYSA-N
PBB-90	C_{12}H_{5}Br_{5}	2,2',3,4',5-pentabromobiphenyl	2181002-70-8	WGWSCCYQAMISJA-UHFFFAOYSA-N
PBB-91	C_{12}H_{5}Br_{5}	2,2',3,4',6-pentabromobiphenyl	2181002-71-9	MCUDUBWNDGFHNH-UHFFFAOYSA-N
PBB-92	C_{12}H_{5}Br_{5}	2,2',3,5,5'-pentabromobiphenyl	2181002-72-0	RZGFOJCNPDOQRS-UHFFFAOYSA-N
PBB-93	C_{12}H_{5}Br_{5}	2,2',3,5,6-pentabromobiphenyl	2181002-73-1	FDLULLAWFPDAOQ-UHFFFAOYSA-N
PBB-94	C_{12}H_{5}Br_{5}	2,2',3,5,6'-pentabromobiphenyl	2181002-74-2	VZESCZJJPVYTGZ-UHFFFAOYSA-N
PBB-95	C_{12}H_{5}Br_{5}	2,2',3,5',6-pentabromobiphenyl	88700-05-4	VADHAYVBWIFCKV-UHFFFAOYSA-N
PBB-96	C_{12}H_{5}Br_{5}	2,2',3,6,6'-pentabromobiphenyl	2181002-75-3	POHQZQLXMOAVKA-UHFFFAOYSA-N
PBB-97	C_{12}H_{5}Br_{5}	2,2',3,4',5'-pentabromobiphenyl	73141-48-7	LPGZHWFFPSNYRH-UHFFFAOYSA-N
PBB-98	C_{12}H_{5}Br_{5}	2,2',3,4',6'-pentabromobiphenyl	2181002-76-4	QDOYXTFCCKEJDB-UHFFFAOYSA-N
PBB-99	C_{12}H_{5}Br_{5}	2,2',4,4',5-pentabromobiphenyl	81397-99-1	IZODQJZFOBNYSJ-UHFFFAOYSA-N
PBB-100	C_{12}H_{5}Br_{5}	2,2',4,4',6-pentabromobiphenyl	97038-97-6	CNHYHTHMZVENHC-UHFFFAOYSA-N
PBB-101	C_{12}H_{5}Br_{5}	2,2',4,5,5'-pentabromobiphenyl	67888-96-4	OELBLPCWLAWABI-UHFFFAOYSA-N
PBB-102	C_{12}H_{5}Br_{5}	2,2',4,5,6'-pentabromobiphenyl	80274-92-6	KXIAEPPRBPRPKO-UHFFFAOYSA-N
PBB-103	C_{12}H_{5}Br_{5}	2,2',4,5',6-pentabromobiphenyl	59080-39-6	NVKQKAZYUPPRJX-UHFFFAOYSA-N
PBB-104	C_{12}H_{5}Br_{5}	2,2',4,6,6'-pentabromobiphenyl	97063-75-7	AQYVCOVEVZLIJZ-UHFFFAOYSA-N
PBB-105	C_{12}H_{5}Br_{5}	2,3,3',4,4'-pentabromobiphenyl	2181002-77-5	WOSCJLPQFDNYIM-UHFFFAOYSA-N
PBB-106	C_{12}H_{5}Br_{5}	2,3,3',4,5-pentabromobiphenyl	2181002-78-6	WJXFZCQKOLQCOB-UHFFFAOYSA-N
PBB-107	C_{12}H_{5}Br_{5}	2,3,3',4',5-pentabromobiphenyl	2181002-79-7	XCNRGBGPZGHONT-UHFFFAOYSA-N
PBB-108	C_{12}H_{5}Br_{5}	2,3,3',4,5'-pentabromobiphenyl	2181002-80-0	IOYPMZSUBHKTPJ-UHFFFAOYSA-N
PBB-109	C_{12}H_{5}Br_{5}	2,3,3',4,6-pentabromobiphenyl	2181002-81-1	QTSIRMZQTHOHNK-UHFFFAOYSA-N
PBB-110	C_{12}H_{5}Br_{5}	2,3,3',4',6-pentabromobiphenyl	144978-89-2	VEVWAGUMMIAFOP-UHFFFAOYSA-N
PBB-111	C_{12}H_{5}Br_{5}	2,3,3',5,5'-pentabromobiphenyl	2181002-82-2	XUEQWWHGNZZMFZ-UHFFFAOYSA-N
PBB-112	C_{12}H_{5}Br_{5}	2,3,3',5,6-pentabromobiphenyl	2181002-83-3	LSGIGHZORPXSRV-UHFFFAOYSA-N
PBB-113	C_{12}H_{5}Br_{5}	2,3,3',5',6-pentabromobiphenyl	2181002-84-4	UMFKUWYQACGSMQ-UHFFFAOYSA-N
PBB-114	C_{12}H_{5}Br_{5}	2,3,4,4',5-pentabromobiphenyl	96551-70-1	BUBFPVURMRYUJF-UHFFFAOYSA-N
PBB-115	C_{12}H_{5}Br_{5}	2,3,4,4',6-pentabromobiphenyl	2181002-85-5	MFUFEBQUQBAWKD-UHFFFAOYSA-N
PBB-116	C_{12}H_{5}Br_{5}	2,3,4,5,6-pentabromobiphenyl	38421-62-4	IUJGENMYAVALTR-UHFFFAOYSA-N
PBB-117	C_{12}H_{5}Br_{5}	2,3,4',5,6-pentabromobiphenyl	2181002-86-6	CJXCHPCXKOEDGD-UHFFFAOYSA-N
PBB-118	C_{12}H_{5}Br_{5}	2,3',4,4',5-pentabromobiphenyl	67888-97-5	YOQVIFKWRYWBEP-UHFFFAOYSA-N
PBB-119	C_{12}H_{5}Br_{5}	2,3',4,4',6-pentabromobiphenyl	86029-64-3	PBFOWFPZALCTIY-UHFFFAOYSA-N
PBB-120	C_{12}H_{5}Br_{5}	2,3',4,5,5'-pentabromobiphenyl	80407-70-1	QGHFNPRLPWJMFO-UHFFFAOYSA-N
PBB-121	C_{12}H_{5}Br_{5}	2,3',4,5',6-pentabromobiphenyl	2181002-87-7	HPKYDABEPHXZID-UHFFFAOYSA-N
PBB-122	C_{12}H_{5}Br_{5}	2,3,3',4',5'-pentabromobiphenyl	2181002-88-8	CMSFLJMSDYTEDK-UHFFFAOYSA-N
PBB-123	C_{12}H_{5}Br_{5}	2,3',4,4',5'-pentabromobiphenyl	74114-77-5	HAEVZKQZBJMVLC-UHFFFAOYSA-N
PBB-124	C_{12}H_{5}Br_{5}	2,3',4',5,5'-pentabromobiphenyl	2181002-89-9	UQYCLTPYPZKNNH-UHFFFAOYSA-N
PBB-125	C_{12}H_{5}Br_{5}	2,3',4',5',6-pentabromobiphenyl	2181002-90-2	AGSLVACVYVSHEH-UHFFFAOYSA-N
PBB-126	C_{12}H_{5}Br_{5}	3,3',4,4',5-pentabromobiphenyl	84303-46-8	DGTPXLZCUVCFEH-UHFFFAOYSA-N
PBB-127	C_{12}H_{5}Br_{5}	3,3',4,5,5'-pentabromobiphenyl	81902-33-2	DZFDQWNBHQDGMZ-UHFFFAOYSA-N
PBB-128	C_{12}H_{4}Br_{6}	2,2',3,3',4,4'-hexabromobiphenyl	82865-89-2	PTJQVJQAZSLKJO-UHFFFAOYSA-N
PBB-129	C_{12}H_{4}Br_{6}	2,2',3,3',4,5-hexabromobiphenyl	245657-50-5	MTBYHHMDLIIEME-UHFFFAOYSA-N
PBB-130	C_{12}H_{4}Br_{6}	2,2',3,3',4,5'-hexabromobiphenyl	82865-90-5	MPQLWJSUSGZNMF-UHFFFAOYSA-N
PBB-131	C_{12}H_{4}Br_{6}	2,2',3,3',4,6-hexabromobiphenyl	2181002-91-3	RLCWRSZMHISQLC-UHFFFAOYSA-N
PBB-132	C_{12}H_{4}Br_{6}	2,2',3,3',4,6'-hexabromobiphenyl	119264-50-5	XKHIVUOSQAVYRG-UHFFFAOYSA-N
PBB-133	C_{12}H_{4}Br_{6}	2,2',3,3',5,5'-hexabromobiphenyl	55066-76-7	OIQABQOZOVLYRA-UHFFFAOYSA-N
PBB-134	C_{12}H_{4}Br_{6}	2,2',3,3',5,6-hexabromobiphenyl	2181002-92-4	BKWRJMJPXPVTMT-UHFFFAOYSA-N
PBB-135	C_{12}H_{4}Br_{6}	2,2',3,3',5,6'-hexabromobiphenyl	119264-51-6	GZMBPIKAXBKPFU-UHFFFAOYSA-N
PBB-136	C_{12}H_{4}Br_{6}	2,2',3,3',6,6'-hexabromobiphenyl	955955-53-0	ILYDFJGBNLAGPE-UHFFFAOYSA-N
PBB-137	C_{12}H_{4}Br_{6}	2,2',3,4,4',5-hexabromobiphenyl	81381-52-4	YDEZWWIXWTUKGY-UHFFFAOYSA-N
PBB-138	C_{12}H_{4}Br_{6}	2,2',3,4,4',5'-hexabromobiphenyl	67888-98-6	BSOYYFPGSFVZRZ-UHFFFAOYSA-N
PBB-139	C_{12}H_{4}Br_{6}	2,2',3,4,4',6-hexabromobiphenyl	2181002-93-5	IJGCJNDJUHFLNC-UHFFFAOYSA-N
PBB-140	C_{12}H_{4}Br_{6}	2,2',3,4,4',6'-hexabromobiphenyl	955955-55-2	CYKVIJHRVPGLEU-UHFFFAOYSA-N
PBB-141	C_{12}H_{4}Br_{6}	2,2',3,4,5,5'-hexabromobiphenyl	120991-47-1	RBEVZFMPNHHLPP-UHFFFAOYSA-N
PBB-142	C_{12}H_{4}Br_{6}	2,2',3,4,5,6-hexabromobiphenyl	2181002-94-6	DJHWAIPYZDRNMH-UHFFFAOYSA-N
PBB-143	C_{12}H_{4}Br_{6}	2,2',3,4,5,6'-hexabromobiphenyl	2181002-95-7	NYXZLTPRNIZLJE-UHFFFAOYSA-N
PBB-144	C_{12}H_{4}Br_{6}	2,2',3,4,5',6-hexabromobiphenyl	119264-52-7	HHVQNEPCJRJARM-UHFFFAOYSA-N
PBB-145	C_{12}H_{4}Br_{6}	2,2',3,4,6,6'-hexabromobiphenyl	2181002-96-8	FAJJWBQHPDLLJB-UHFFFAOYSA-N
PBB-146	C_{12}H_{4}Br_{6}	2,2',3,4',5,5'-hexabromobiphenyl	144978-88-1	NLAALEKNOMQKJJ-UHFFFAOYSA-N
PBB-147	C_{12}H_{4}Br_{6}	2,2',3,4',5,6-hexabromobiphenyl	2181002-97-9	CTBYGENDQFFFFM-UHFFFAOYSA-N
PBB-148	C_{12}H_{4}Br_{6}	2,2',3,4',5,6'-hexabromobiphenyl	955955-54-1	JFBKXBQYBBDZBV-UHFFFAOYSA-N
PBB-149	C_{12}H_{4}Br_{6}	2,2',3,4',5',6-hexabromobiphenyl	69278-59-7	IKIIHEWEIKDZIG-UHFFFAOYSA-N
PBB-150	C_{12}H_{4}Br_{6}	2,2',3,4',6,6'-hexabromobiphenyl	93261-83-7	IQTCAECVXQIAJP-UHFFFAOYSA-N
PBB-151	C_{12}H_{4}Br_{6}	2,2',3,5,5',6-hexabromobiphenyl	119264-53-8	QYSHJTQTFZMBRT-UHFFFAOYSA-N
PBB-152	C_{12}H_{4}Br_{6}	2,2',3,5,6,6'-hexabromobiphenyl	2181002-98-0	ALUXUWNEDHWSFR-UHFFFAOYSA-N
PBB-153	C_{12}H_{4}Br_{6}	2,2',4,4',5,5'-hexabromobiphenyl	59080-40-9	HMBBJSKXDBUNNT-UHFFFAOYSA-N
PBB-154	C_{12}H_{4}Br_{6}	2,2',4,4',5,6'-hexabromobiphenyl	36402-15-0	SGDPXKBCMMVXTH-UHFFFAOYSA-N
PBB-155	C_{12}H_{4}Br_{6}	2,2',4,4',6,6'-hexabromobiphenyl	59261-08-4	LNFYSRMCCKKDEH-UHFFFAOYSA-N
PBB-156	C_{12}H_{4}Br_{6}	2,3,3',4,4',5-hexabromobiphenyl	77607-09-1	LSUMPCYLOQMSTJ-UHFFFAOYSA-N
PBB-157	C_{12}H_{4}Br_{6}	2,3,3',4,4',5'-hexabromobiphenyl	84303-47-9	PCEAPJVBSINMNW-UHFFFAOYSA-N
PBB-158	C_{12}H_{4}Br_{6}	2,3,3',4,4',6-hexabromobiphenyl	144978-87-0	KTHXGSIZQZTUIZ-UHFFFAOYSA-N
PBB-159	C_{12}H_{4}Br_{6}	2,3,3',4,5,5'-hexabromobiphenyl	120991-48-2	SBPKBQJLKKDLLR-UHFFFAOYSA-N
PBB-160	C_{12}H_{4}Br_{6}	2,3,3',4,5,6-hexabromobiphenyl	2181002-99-1	RXYMEPNSQHIRKB-UHFFFAOYSA-N
PBB-161	C_{12}H_{4}Br_{6}	2,3,3',4,5',6-hexabromobiphenyl	2181003-00-7	HEWKTGCACCIJPT-UHFFFAOYSA-N
PBB-162	C_{12}H_{4}Br_{6}	2,3,3',4',5,5'-hexabromobiphenyl	2181003-01-8	DEMJRHFYBOEUEQ-UHFFFAOYSA-N
PBB-163	C_{12}H_{4}Br_{6}	2,3,3',4',5,6-hexabromobiphenyl	2181003-02-9	FPXOEHMNGMCUKP-UHFFFAOYSA-N
PBB-164	C_{12}H_{4}Br_{6}	2,3,3',4',5',6-hexabromobiphenyl	82865-91-6	ARNGRRVFGZFOFY-UHFFFAOYSA-N
PBB-165	C_{12}H_{4}Br_{6}	2,3,3',5,5',6-hexabromobiphenyl	2181003-03-0	FDQLVUNFRCAZOQ-UHFFFAOYSA-N
PBB-166	C_{12}H_{4}Br_{6}	2,3,4,4',5,6-hexabromobiphenyl	2181003-04-1	QREFSDUWMIKETQ-UHFFFAOYSA-N
PBB-167	C_{12}H_{4}Br_{6}	2,3',4,4',5,5'-hexabromobiphenyl	67888-99-7	GNBOTFDIPRGROV-UHFFFAOYSA-N
PBB-168	C_{12}H_{4}Br_{6}	2,3',4,4',5',6-hexabromobiphenyl	84303-48-0	QYJUWEAWGVJUJE-UHFFFAOYSA-N
PBB-169	C_{12}H_{4}Br_{6}	3,3',4,4',5,5'-hexabromobiphenyl	60044-26-0	UXOOFXUEODCAIP-UHFFFAOYSA-N
PBB-170	C_{12}H_{3}Br_{7}	2,2',3,3',4,4',5-heptabromobiphenyl	69278-60-0	MUVQKYHTVKKBFK-UHFFFAOYSA-N
PBB-171	C_{12}H_{3}Br_{7}	2,2',3,3',4,4',6-heptabromobiphenyl	942505-32-0	NBFMBEUCRXDQTL-UHFFFAOYSA-N
PBB-172	C_{12}H_{3}Br_{7}	2,2',3,3',4,5,5'-heptabromobiphenyl	82865-92-7	ODFOICVBRZRHID-UHFFFAOYSA-N
PBB-173	C_{12}H_{3}Br_{7}	2,2',3,3',4,5,6-heptabromobiphenyl	955955-59-6	SMVYDWVPKUOWAJ-UHFFFAOYSA-N
PBB-174	C_{12}H_{3}Br_{7}	2,2',3,3',4,5,6'-heptabromobiphenyl	88700-04-3	ZYYNNJQZIKFCEI-UHFFFAOYSA-N
PBB-175	C_{12}H_{3}Br_{7}	2,2',3,3',4,5',6-heptabromobiphenyl	475200-12-5	HNNWSNAULBYUQK-UHFFFAOYSA-N
PBB-176	C_{12}H_{3}Br_{7}	2,2',3,3',4,6,6'-heptabromobiphenyl	955955-57-4	YHDUZKGCRRDSFA-UHFFFAOYSA-N
PBB-177	C_{12}H_{3}Br_{7}	2,2',3,3',4,5',6'-heptabromobiphenyl	955955-58-5	KZWHNYWJWDTTCF-UHFFFAOYSA-N
PBB-178	C_{12}H_{3}Br_{7}	2,2',3,3',5,5',6-heptabromobiphenyl	119264-54-9	DIMYEFPFSWJMHA-UHFFFAOYSA-N
PBB-179	C_{12}H_{3}Br_{7}	2,2',3,3',5,6,6'-heptabromobiphenyl	955955-56-3	HCGHFEWMWURGME-UHFFFAOYSA-N
PBB-180	C_{12}H_{3}Br_{7}	2,2',3,4,4',5,5'-heptabromobiphenyl	67733-52-2	RPGHQOFAFNAVNA-UHFFFAOYSA-N
PBB-181	C_{12}H_{3}Br_{7}	2,2',3,4,4',5,6-heptabromobiphenyl	942505-33-1	WDSQGXFXMAKQKW-UHFFFAOYSA-N
PBB-182	C_{12}H_{3}Br_{7}	2,2',3,4,4',5,6'-heptabromobiphenyl	119264-55-0	GPCHVALQFNFSDB-UHFFFAOYSA-N
PBB-183	C_{12}H_{3}Br_{7}	2,2',3,4,4',5',6-heptabromobiphenyl	942505-34-2	LGUZUVMQTOBJSI-UHFFFAOYSA-N
PBB-184	C_{12}H_{3}Br_{7}	2,2',3,4,4',6,6'-heptabromobiphenyl	119264-56-1	LQOCPXSKJXFVAD-UHFFFAOYSA-N
PBB-185	C_{12}H_{3}Br_{7}	2,2',3,4,5,5',6-heptabromobiphenyl	245657-57-2	IOVCQQRGHUWFML-UHFFFAOYSA-N
PBB-186	C_{12}H_{3}Br_{7}	2,2',3,4,5,6,6'-heptabromobiphenyl	119264-57-2	FDSVFTKTWCIQCW-UHFFFAOYSA-N
PBB-187	C_{12}H_{3}Br_{7}	2,2',3,4',5,5',6-heptabromobiphenyl	84303-49-1	RBWZYLZOKXWBII-UHFFFAOYSA-N
PBB-188	C_{12}H_{3}Br_{7}	2,2',3,4',5,6,6'-heptabromobiphenyl	119264-58-3	TVKXXBLCBLCNCE-UHFFFAOYSA-N
PBB-189	C_{12}H_{3}Br_{7}	2,3,3',4,4',5,5'-heptabromobiphenyl	88700-06-5	JXWDAVSERCQYSS-UHFFFAOYSA-N
PBB-190	C_{12}H_{3}Br_{7}	2,3,3',4,4',5,6-heptabromobiphenyl	79682-25-0	RKSHLITXOOZMAV-UHFFFAOYSA-N
PBB-191	C_{12}H_{3}Br_{7}	2,3,3',4,4',5',6-heptabromobiphenyl	942505-35-3	ZOHVMUYBJUNENU-UHFFFAOYSA-N
PBB-192	C_{12}H_{3}Br_{7}	2,3,3',4,5,5',6-heptabromobiphenyl	955955-60-9	FERSPRIXLHELTC-UHFFFAOYSA-N
PBB-193	C_{12}H_{3}Br_{7}	2,3,3',4',5,5',6-heptabromobiphenyl	955955-61-0	FMOBFMNJXUQQJR-UHFFFAOYSA-N
PBB-194	C_{12}H_{2}Br_{8}	2,2',3,3',4,4',5,5'-octabromobiphenyl	67889-00-3	HHYHNDNRLUQCEG-UHFFFAOYSA-N
PBB-195	C_{12}H_{2}Br_{8}	2,2',3,3',4,4',5,6-octabromobiphenyl	2181003-05-2	NDRKXFLZSRHAJE-UHFFFAOYSA-N
PBB-196	C_{12}H_{2}Br_{8}	2,2',3,3',4,4',5,6'-octabromobiphenyl	69278-61-1	MOIDFYBXINJWHO-UHFFFAOYSA-N
PBB-197	C_{12}H_{2}Br_{8}	2,2',3,3',4,4',6,6'-octabromobiphenyl	119264-59-4	TUXCLUQAWBNRIW-UHFFFAOYSA-N
PBB-198	C_{12}H_{2}Br_{8}	2,2',3,3',4,5,5',6-octabromobiphenyl	2181003-06-3	XDKUKDMODQQDQE-UHFFFAOYSA-N
PBB-199	C_{12}H_{2}Br_{8}	2,2',3,3',4,5,5',6'-octabromobiphenyl	69887-11-2	SKGYJIOAIRCMIC-UHFFFAOYSA-N
PBB-200	C_{12}H_{2}Br_{8}	2,2',3,3',4,5,6,6'-octabromobiphenyl	1254976-38-9	BLQBTCGUQAFXCS-UHFFFAOYSA-N
PBB-201	C_{12}H_{2}Br_{8}	2,2',3,3',4,5',6,6'-octabromobiphenyl	119264-60-7	XWEDREXJLOGPJT-UHFFFAOYSA-N
PBB-202	C_{12}H_{2}Br_{8}	2,2',3,3',5,5',6,6'-octabromobiphenyl	59080-41-0	IQIHDBRYKJLECA-UHFFFAOYSA-N
PBB-203	C_{12}H_{2}Br_{8}	2,2',3,4,4',5,5',6-octabromobiphenyl	942505-36-4	IZASMDVLGHUEOI-UHFFFAOYSA-N
PBB-204	C_{12}H_{2}Br_{8}	2,2',3,4,4',5,6,6'-octabromobiphenyl	119264-61-8	PFBOUFHNJQYEJX-UHFFFAOYSA-N
PBB-205	C_{12}H_{2}Br_{8}	2,3,3',4,4',5,5',6-octabromobiphenyl	915039-12-2	CHJHBOFOLOYRTO-UHFFFAOYSA-N
PBB-206	C_{12}HBr_{9}	2,2',3,3',4,4',5,5',6-nonabromobiphenyl	69278-62-2	QLERKXRXNDBTDM-UHFFFAOYSA-N
PBB-207	C_{12}HBr_{9}	2,2',3,3',4,4',5,6,6'-nonabromobiphenyl	119264-62-9	LWICCBMIAPTSTO-UHFFFAOYSA-N
PBB-208	C_{12}HBr_{9}	2,2',3,3',4,5,5',6,6'-nonabromobiphenyl	119264-63-0	WOYQCNXYPKFHRQ-UHFFFAOYSA-N
PBB-209	C_{12}Br_{10}	decabromobiphenyl	13654-09-6	AQPHBYQUCKHJLT-UHFFFAOYSA-N

== Characteristics ==
PBBs usually exist as colorless to off-white solids. PBBs soften at 72 degrees Celsius and decompose above 300 degrees Celsius. They have low vapor pressure, are very soluble in benzene and toluene, and insoluble in water. They are degraded by UV light.

== Application ==
PBBs are used as flame retardants of the brominated flame retardant group. They are added to plastics used in products such as home electrical appliances, textiles, plastic foams, laptop cabinets, etc. to make them difficult to burn.

A number of substituted PBBs found application in medicine, namely bromophene and bromofenofos.

== Health hazards ==
Exposure to the coplanar stereoisomer 3,3',4,4',5,5'-hexabromobiphenyl (but not the non-coplanar stereoisomer) in genetically susceptible mice is known to cause immunotoxicity and disorders related to the central nervous system, and even at doses as low as 2.5 mg/kg, excess neonatal fatalities are observed (LD_{50} is from 5–10 mg/kg). The mechanism of toxicity is thought to be related to aryl hydrocarbon receptor activation.

There is evidence that pre- and post-natal exposure to PBB can cause early menarche.

Early studies on the effects of PBBs on human beings concerned the people in Michigan, United States who consumed PBB-contaminated animal products (see history of PBBs below). A study of 327 girls aged 5–24 years in Michigan found those who were exposed in utero to PBBs at or above a level of 7 ppb found had an earlier age at menarche compared to a case-control group. Michigan dairy farmers exposed to PBBs had significant immune system abnormalities including reduced numbers of circulating blood lymphocytes, increases in lymphocytes with no detectable surface markers, and reduced functional response to specific test antigens. Some residents complained of nausea, abdominal pain, loss of appetite, joint pain and lethargy, though it could not be clearly established that PBBs were the cause of these health problems. Workers who were exposed to PBB during PBB production suffered hypothyroidism, although no deterioration in memory performance was found in PBB-exposed workers in tests conducted several years after final PBB exposure, and there was also no correlation of performance with PBB concentration.

There is stronger evidence that PBBs may have caused skin problems, such as acne, in consumers of the contaminated food. Some workers exposed to PBBs by breathing and skin contact for days to months also developed acne.

Studies in animals exposed to large amounts of PBBs for a short period or to smaller amounts over a longer period show that PBBs can cause weight loss, skin disorders, nervous and immune systems effects, as well as effects on the liver, kidneys, and thyroid gland.

=== Possibility of carcinogenicity ===
It is not known for certain if PBBs could cause cancer in human beings, but it has been observed that they can lead to cancer in lab mice exposed to very high concentrations of PBBs. Based on such animal tests, the United States Department of Health and Human Services has determined that PBBs may reasonably be anticipated to be carcinogens. The International Agency for Research on Cancer also suggests that PBBs are possibly carcinogenic to humans.

== Michigan PBB contamination incident ==
Structure of 2,2′,4,4′,5,5′-hexabromobiphenyl

Before the 1970s, PBBs were widely used commercially as a flame retardant. Michigan Chemical Corporation (MCC) in St. Louis, Michigan, which was then owned by Velsicol Chemical Corporation, was a major producer of the FireMaster range of PBB-based flame retardants. FireMaster BP-6 (a yellow-brown powder) is a mixture of many different PBB congeners with 2,2',4,4',5,5'-hexabromobiphenyl and 2,2',3,4,4',5,5'-heptabromobiphenyl being significant constituents by mass (60-80% and 12-25%, respectively). FireMaster FF-1 (a white powder) is FireMaster BP-6 with the addition of 2% calcium silicate as an anti-caking agent. Mixed bromochlorobiphenyls and polybrominated naphthalenes, as well as lower brominated compounds formed by incomplete bromination, have also been found as minor constituents of FireMaster products.

In summer 1973, several thousand pounds of FireMaster BP-6 were accidentally mixed with livestock feed that was distributed to farms in Michigan because the MCC plant also produced a feed precursor ingredient, magnesium oxide, which was sold to the feed manufacturer. Some 1.5 million chickens, 30,000 cattle, 5,900 pigs, and 1,470 sheep then consumed this feed, became contaminated with PBBs and the carcasses were disposed of in landfill sites throughout the state. In 1976, the Michigan Department of Community Health established a PBB registry to gather and analyze data on exposed residents. It now resides at the Rollins School of Public Health at Emory University, and is maintained by epidemiologist Michele Marcus.

Michigan Farmer magazine staff members Richard Lehnert and Bonnie Pollard broke the news of the contamination. The magazine continued coverage of the issue until the eventual bankruptcy proceedings of the farm cooperative responsible for the accidental contamination and subsequent distribution of the feed. These events were also portrayed in the 1981 documentary Cattlegate by Jeff Jackson, the true-fiction film Bitter Harvest starring Ron Howard, and in the book The Poisoning of Michigan by Joyce Egginton. A 1978 episode of Lou Grant ("Slaughter") portrays a similar, but fictionalized account. One year elapsed before the animals were culled.

This incident is cited amongst a handful of other noxious substances as the driver for President Gerald Ford's reluctant approval in 1976 of the Toxic Substances Control Act, which "remains one of the most controversial regulatory bills ever passed".

=== Landrigan study ===
A study was undertaken on 4,545 people to determine the effects of PBBs on human beings. These include three exposure groups – all people who lived on the quarantined farms, people who received food from these farms and workers (and their families) engaged in PBB manufacture – as well as 725 people with low-level PBB exposure.

All were queried concerning 17 symptoms and conditions possibly related to PBBs. Venous blood was drawn and analyzed for PBB by gas chromatography. Mean serum PBB levels were found to be 26.9 ppb by weight (26.9 μg/kg) in farm residents, 17.1 in recipients, 43.0 ppb in workers, and 3.4 ppb in the low exposure group. No associations could be established between serum PBB levels and symptom prevalence rates.

To evaluate peripheral lymphocyte function, T and B cell quantitation and in vitro responses to three nonspecific mitogens were studied in 34 persons with highest PBB levels (mean: 787 ppb), and in 56 with low levels (mean: 2.8 ppb). No statistically significant differences in lymphocyte function were noted.

However, as of 2015 these studies are still ongoing, and 40 years later adverse reproductive-system effects (as measured by the Apgar score of the newborns) continue to be found in the grandchildren of those who consumed tainted farm products.

== Bans and restrictions ==
Noting the possible hazards on the environment, PBBs were listed as one of six controlled substances under the Restriction of Hazardous Substances Directive (RoHS), which was enacted into European Law in February 2003. RoHS legislation lists PBBs as a "restricted substance" group. Other countries followed suit, resulting most recently in restriction dates instituted in China on March 1, 2007, and South Korea on July 1, 2007.
