= Battery Directive =

European Union regulation

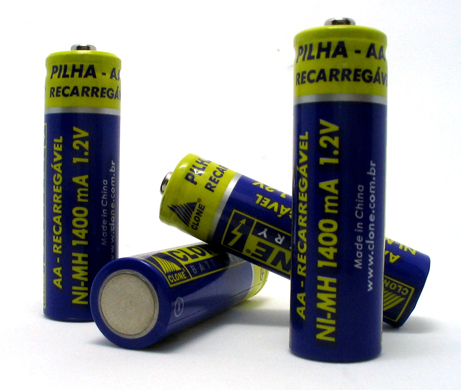
Rechargeable nickel–metal hydride AA batteries are among the types of batteries that the Battery Directive allows its general use.

The Directive 2006/66/EC of the European Parliament and of the Council of 6 September 2006 on batteries and accumulators and waste batteries and accumulators and repealing Directive 91/157/EEC, commonly known as the Battery Directive, regulates the manufacture and disposal of batteries in the European Union with the aim of "improving the environmental performance of batteries and accumulators".

Batteries commonly contain hazardous elements such as mercury, cadmium, and lead, which when incinerated or landfilled, present a risk to the environment and human health.

Directive 91/157/EEC was adopted on 18 March 1991 to reduce these hazards by harmonising EU member states' laws on the disposal and recycling of batteries containing dangerous substances. Directive 2006/66/EC repealed Directive 91/157/EEC and

- sets maximum quantities for certain chemicals and metals in certain batteries,
- tasks Member States with encouraging improvements to the environmental performance of batteries,
- requires proper waste management of these batteries, including recycling, collections, "take-back" programs, and disposal,
- sets waste battery collection rates,
- sets financial responsibility for programs,
- and makes rules covering most phases of this legislation, including labelling, marking, documentation, reviews, and other administrative and procedural matters.

Directive 2006/66/EC was amended by Directive 2013/56/EU of 20 November 2013, as regards the placing on the market of portable batteries and accumulators containing cadmium intended for use in cordless power tools, and of button cells with low mercury content, and repealing Commission Decision 2009/603/EC.

== General ==
This directive, like many other European compliance directives, is not directly applicable, but requires legislative action from European Member States. Though European directives are legislation, European Union Member States must comply with them to avoid legal action that the European Commission can bring to bear if they don't. However Member States retain some freedom by what means they implement a directive's requirements.

The battery directive has the objective of improving the environmental performance of batteries by regulating the use of certain substances in the manufacture of batteries (lead, mercury, cadmium, etc.) and setting standards for the waste management of these batteries. Many European member states have passed battery and waste management laws. Among those nations are: Belgium, Sweden, Germany, Austria, Denmark, Finland, the United Kingdom, the Netherlands, France, and others. Finland and Denmark have supported a total prohibition of cadmium in batteries. Belgium and Sweden have battery recycling rates of 59% and 55% respectively. With the finalisation of the 2006 Battery Directive, European states now have specific guidelines to which to make rules to comport.

== History ==
=== Early waste directives ===
The first of the western European directives dealing with waste management was the "Council Directive 75/442/EEC of 15 July 1975 on Waste." It didn't mention batteries or chemicals but specified the regulation of "particular categories of waste," which was later referenced to by both Battery Directives as a legislative or legal basis. The first version of the European Council Directive on Batteries and Accumulators 91/157/EEC was approved on 18 March 1991. It covered many battery types, including industrial, automotive, dry-cell, lead-acid, alkaline, nickel-cadmium, nickel-metal-hydride, lithium, lithium-ion, mercury, etc. The first program in the directive was set for a six-year duration, starting in 1993.

=== Provisions of the first directive ===
The 1991 battery Directive's "Article 3; MI; Annex I" stated the prohibition (with exceptions) of marketing:

1. Batteries on the market after 18 September 1992 with:
  - 1.A. more than 25 mg of mercury per cell, except alkaline manganese batteries
  - 1.B. more than 0.025% cadmium by weight
  - 1.C. more than 0.4% lead by weight
2. Alkaline manganese batteries placed on the market after 18 September 1992 containing more than 0.025% of mercury by weight
3. Batteries on the market after 1 January 1999 with more than 0.0005% mercury by weight

Since battery recycling rates then were about 5% the directive sought to improve these rates. It set up recycling goals: separate collection and recycling, and provide recycling/collection information to the consumer. The responsibility for providing separated recycling collection was largely given to the manufacturers. Recycling requirements are found in Articles 4, 6, and 7.

There were marking provisions, including manufacturer responsibility for marking on the battery products themselves the contained substances and recycling information.

=== Resistance ===
Regulation was met with heavy resistance. Disputed were deadlines, target recycling rates, implementation dates, weight percentage limits, applicable product groups, financial responsibility for public information campaigns and waste management (and its financial impact), exclusions of financial responsibility given to small producer businesses, and personnel safety from decreased reliability of "greener" batteries.

In a non-environmental battery marking question, automotive battery makers questioned markings on batteries relating to battery performance, arguing that the quantity of a car battery's electric current output to start a vehicle in extreme weather was a very good indicator of battery performance.

After poor implementation of the first Battery Directive, work began on a new directive that would more emphasise battery end-of-life waste management through mandated and better-structured collection and recycling programs. It was also acknowledged that more research on certain substance was needed before harsher, more complete, and, arguably, unrealistic, bans. Thus the onus was on everyone in the waste management chain, from producer to the consumer, rather than affecting product design with substance bans that manufacturers claimed are unreasonable.

=== Conciliation Committee's compromise ===
Consultations to revisions of the first battery Directive started in 1997, giving all interested parties a voice in legislation and policy, especially in assessing the directive's economic, environmental, and social impact. In February 2003 an open stakeholders consultation process was started, which published its findings online, and culminated in a meeting in Brussels, in July 2003. The waters were tested by asking for Extended Impact Assessments for different scenarios of proposed ranges of regulation. For example, what would be the impact in establishing spent battery collection targets of from 30% to 80% or the impact of SEPARATE spent battery collection of from 70% to 100%? Entities were asked how these goals could be met and to propose collection responsibility models.

The "green" viewpoint (and perhaps that of the Conciliation Committee's) was that the previous Directive had been limited in scope, while groups on the other side set forth reasons for less stringency. Those arguing for broadening the scope claimed that if batteries with certain metals were not banned carte blanche then the waste management effort would be hurt by confusion and perhaps inconvenience to the public.

There were at least six drafts the 2003 version, which was equivalent to a second battery directive. The 2003 revision, Council Directive 2003/0282/COD, a July 2006 "conciliation agreement," was a compromise between the European Council and European Parliament, and came after three years of draft revisions. It was welcomed by entities like the European Portable Battery Association (EPBA), that favoured less stringency. As in other models of European compliance legislation, a corporation or organisations like the EPBA participates in working groups with members that include, among other players, legislators, large enterprises—in this case, battery-makers—trade associations, and non-governmental organisations. The Directive's overall stated objective was still to protect the public interest with a cleaner environment by minimising the negative impact on the environment of batteries, especially in their waste cycle. Depending on the viewpoint, it was also something of a compromise between 1. manufacturers and distributors, and 3. environmental proponents.

== 2006 Battery Directive ==
The most recent Battery Directive, which entered into force on 26 September 2006, gave European Member States until 26 September 2008 to implement national laws and rules on batteries (Art.26 – Transposition). Some nations took the initiative and had already started programs and passed laws in accordance with the spirit and specifications of earlier battery directives.

With the exception of button cells with a mercury content of no more than 2% by weight, the 2006 Battery Directive restates the earlier Battery Directive's prohibition of marketing batteries with more than 0.0005% mercury and 0.002% cadmium by weight. However, some exceptions exist. The directive also mandates symbols for battery labels that indicate the battery's chemical contents if lead, mercury, or cadmium are used. According to this directive, lead content in batteries is no longer restricted.

There should be initiatives to reduce heavy metal in batteries, promote using less toxic substances in batteries, dispose of batteries properly (not via regular household waste, but properly separated), research initiatives in the above and in recycling. Consumers should be informed of the dangers in non-compliant disposal of old batteries. It also states that it must be easy for consumers to remove batteries from electronic products.

=== Battery disposal ===
Disposal of automotive and industrial batteries by leaving in landfills or by incineration "should be prohibited". (Directive preamble point #8)

=== Recycling and collection of batteries ===
Article 7 requires Member States to maximise the "separation" of batteries from regular municipal waste and requires spent batteries to be collected separately. Recycling and collection targets are called for so that fewer batteries end up in landfills.

The collection program is found in Annex I. It is proposed that member states set their own country's standards using the Battery Directive as a guide for minimum levels. These levels are stated in terms of percents of prior annual sales. Article 3(17) states "'collection rate' means, for a given Member State in a given calendar year, the percentage obtained by dividing the weight of waste portable batteries and accumulators collected in accordance with Article 8(1) of this Directive or with Directive 2002/96/EC in that calendar year by the average weight of portable batteries and accumulators that producers either sell directly to end-users or deliver to third parties in order to sell them to end-users in that Member State during that calendar year and the preceding two calendar years."

Member States are required to provide collection sites that are accessible and free of charge to the public (Art. 8). Battery distributors may be required to provide this at Member States' discretion (Art. 8(2)(a)). Battery manufacturers may not refuse to take back waste batteries from end-consumers, irrespective of their chemical composition or origin (Art. 8(3)).

Waste battery collection rate targets are specified in Article 10. Minimum targets of 25% of battery sales and 45% of battery sales by 26 September 2012 and 2016 respectively(Art. 10(2)).

Collections rates are to be monitored annually as outlined in Annex I scheme, with yearly reporting to the Commission. There may be some leeway given in the form of "transitional agreements" if a nation has special circumstances. (Art. 10 (4))

=== Exclusions and exemptions ===
There are many exclusions granted to manufacturers and certain product types. In some cases these are for batteries used in safety or other critical-use applications (e.g. miners' caps).

Exemptions for the following are still in place:

- Article 2 – Space, military, munitions, and "essential security" applications
- Article 4 – Mercury Ban: Button cells with 2% or less mercury content by weight
- Article 4 – Cadmium Ban: Emergency, emergency lighting, emergency doors, and alarm systems; medical equipment; cordless power tools
- Article 14 – Incinerator and landfill disposal ban: Residues of batteries that have gone through appropriate treatment as per Art. 12(1) may be disposed of in landfills or by incineration.
- Article 18 – possibility to exclude small producers from the requirements of financing

=== Inclusions ===
Batteries imported from third countries under non-discriminatory conditions are included (Art. 19).

=== Economic instruments ===
Member states may use instruments like differential tax rates to encourage less toxic batteries and recycling (Art. 9)

=== Implementation reports ===
Member states are required to submit implementation reports to the commission every three years (Art. 22).

=== Labelling ===
In Art. 21 marking must indicate separate collections or recycling and the heavy metal content. Labels should state collection information and chemical content of batteries. They should show a symbol of the "crossed-out" wheeled recycling bin (Annex II) to indicate that the battery should not go in the bin. This symbol size is specified as a percent of battery area on its largest side (3%), except for cylindrical batteries, where the symbol should be 1.5% of total surface area.

=== Penalties ===
Member states will set up measures for "effective, proportionate, and dissuasive" penalties for actions not comporting to the battery Directive and apprise the European Commission of these measures and any changes (Art. 25).

=== Collection targets ===
Annex I Battery Collection Targets mentioned in Art. 10 above:

Annex I – Monitoring of Compliance with the Article 10 Collection Targets
Year	Data collection	Data collection	Calculation	Reporting Requirement
X*+1	Sales in year 1 (S1)	..	..	..
X+2	Sales in year 2 (S2)	..	..	..
X+3	Sales in year 3 (S3)	Collection in year 3 (C3)	Collection rate (CR3) = 3*C3/(S1+S2+S3)	..
X+4	Sales in year 4 (S4)	Collection in year 4 (C4)	Collection rate (CR4) = 3*C4/(S2+S3+S4) (Target set at 25%.)	..
X+5	Sales in year 5 (S5)	Collection in year 5 (C5)	Collection rate (CR5) = 3*C5/(S3+S4+S5)	CR4
X+6	Sales in year 6 (S6)	Collection in year 6 (C6)	Collection rate (CR6) = 3*C6/(S4+S5+S6)	CR5
X+7	Sales in year 7 (S7)	Collection in year 7 (C7)	Collection rate (CR7) = 3*C7/(S5+S6+S7)	CR6
X+8	Sales in year 8 (S8)	Collection in year 8 (C8)	Collection rate (CR8) = 3*C8/(S6+S7+S8) (Target set at 45%.)	CR7
X+9	Sales in year 9 (S9)	Collection in year 9 (C9)	Collection rate (CR9) = 3*C9/(S7+S8+S9)	CR8
X+10	Sales in year 10 (S10)	Collection in year 10 (C10)	Collection rate (CR10) = 3*C10/(S8+S9+10)	CR9
X+11	Etc.	Etc.	Etc.	CR10
Etc.	..	..	..	..

- Year X is the year including the date mentioned in Article 26.

=== In practice ===
In practice, manufacturers of batteries need to make sure they have applied the legal framework to their company. This means they need to check who the producer under legal terms of the directive is and whether they have fulfilled the labelling obligation. In the next step manufacturers or distributors have to define their battery strategy and register with battery compliance schemes to control battery compliance and monitor recycling and recovery results. While working within the framework of the battery directive manufacturers, producers and distributors also have to be aware of financial aspects and registration timelines to ensure compliance and reduce risks of their batteries. Most of the time they are supported with advice by suitable qualified persons.

== Related laws ==
The Mercury-Containing and Rechargeable Battery Management Act of 1996 is a similar law in the United States, banning the sale of mercury-containing batteries (except small button cells), and requiring labelling for disposal and recycling. The U.S. state of California and New York City require recycling of rechargeable batteries, and along with the state of Maine require the recycling of cell phones.

Similar European pieces of legislation protecting the environment and health, parallel to the Battery Directive, are the Restriction of Hazardous Substances (RoHS), Waste Electrical and Electronic Equipment (WEEE) Directives and Registration, Evaluation, Authorisation and Restriction of Chemicals (REACH) Regulation.

== See also ==
- Battery recycling
- List of European Union directives
