= Bromophene =

Names
- Preferred IUPAC name 3,3′,5,5′-Tetrabromo[1,1′-biphenyl]-2,2′-diol
- Other names MC21-A; C58; 2,2'-Dihydroxy-3,3',5,5'-tetrabromobiphenyl; 3,3',5,5'-Tetrabromo-2,2'-biphenyldiol

Identifiers
CAS Number	21987-62-2
3D model (JSmol)	Interactive image
ChemSpider	28660
ECHA InfoCard	100.161.669
MeSH	3,3',5,5'-tetrabromo-2,2'-biphenyldiol
PubChem CID	30891
RTECS number	DV5185000
UNII	3BG8N9724B
CompTox Dashboard (EPA)	DTXSID30176404
- InChI: InChI=1S/C12H6Br4O2/c13-5-1-7(11(17)9(15)3-5)8-2-6(14)4-10(16)12(8)18/h1-4,17-18H Key: TXODBIOSWNNKJM-UHFFFAOYSA-N
- SMILES: C1=C(C=C(C(=C1Br)O)C2=CC(=CC(=C2O)Br)Br)Br

Properties
Chemical formula	C_{12}H_{6}Br_{4}O_{2}
Molar mass	501.794 g·mol^{−1}
Appearance	White, needle-like crystals or white powder. (Crystallization from acetone, EtOH or CHCl_{3})
Melting point	205 to 207 °C (401 to 405 °F; 478 to 480 K)
Solubility in water	Sol. DMSO, Acetone, CHCl_{3} Slightly Sol. EtOH, MeOH; Insol. H_{2}O, hexane

Related compounds
Related biphenyls	MC21-B; Polybrominated biphenyl
- Except where otherwise noted, data are given for materials in their standard state (at 25 °C [77 °F], 100 kPa). Infobox references

Bromophene (MC21-A or C58) is a bactericidal antibiotic first isolated from the O-BC30 strain of a marine bacterium, Pseudoalteromonas phenolica. A 2024 study reported that bromophene exhibited antibacterial activity against methicillin-resistant Staphylococcus aureus (MRSA), with a minimum inhibitory concentration of 2 μg/mL against 39 different isolates. In the same study, bromophene exhibited in vitro antibacterial activity comparable to or greater than that of daptomycin, vancomycin, and linezolid under the conditions tested. Additionally, bromophene eradicated established MRSA biofilms at a concentration of 8 μg/mL in vitro, whereas vancomycin did not achieve partial biofilm eradication at the concentrations evaluated in the same study.

== Mechanism of Action ==
The mechanism of action for bromophene has not been fully elucidated. However, previous reports describe increased bacterial membrane permeability without cell lysis.
