= MSrE M-21 =

M-21 Harag
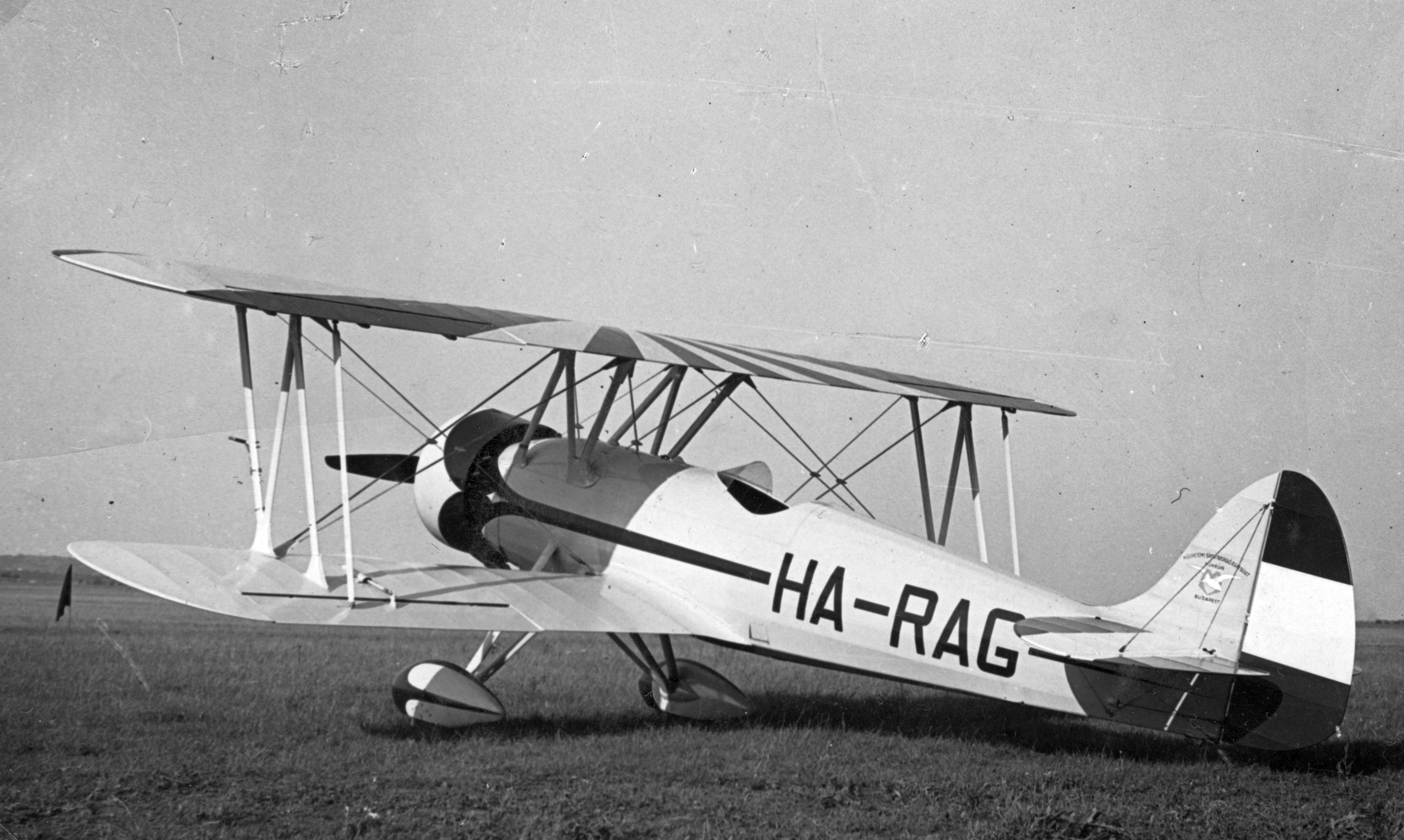
- M-21 Harag in 1938

General information
- Type: Aerobatics aircraft
- National origin: Hungary
- Manufacturer: Műegyetemi Sportrepülő Egyesület
- Designer: József Szegedy and Endre Jancsó
- Number built: 1

History
- First flight: 1936

The MSrE M-21 Harag (Hungarian: "Fury") was an aerobatics aircraft built in Hungary in 1936, sometimes known as the Szegedy M-21 after one of its designers, József Szegedy. It was a conventional biplane design with single-bay staggered wings of equal span braced by N-struts. The pilot sat in an open cockpit, and the tailwheel undercarriage featured divided main units. Only a single example was built.

== Specifications ==
Data from Jane's All the World's Aircraft 1938

General characteristics

- Crew: 1
- Length: 6.8 m (22 ft 4 in)
- Wingspan: 8.3 m (27 ft 3 in)
- Height: 2.7 m (8 ft 10 in)
- Empty weight: 550 kg (1,213 lb)
- Gross weight: 760 kg (1,676 lb)
- Powerplant: 1 × Siemens Sh14A 7-cylinder radial, 120 kW (160 hp)

Performance

- Maximum speed: 220 km/h (140 mph, 120 kn)
- Cruise speed: 175 km/h (109 mph, 94 kn)
- Service ceiling: 4,000 m (13,000 ft)
- Rate of climb: 5.0 m/s (980 ft/min) initial
