= Pseudoalteromonas phenolica =

Scientific classification
- Domain: Bacteria
- Kingdom: Pseudomonadati
- Phylum: Pseudomonadota
- Class: Gammaproteobacteria
- Order: Alteromonadales
- Family: Pseudoalteromonadaceae
- Genus: Pseudoalteromonas
- Species: P. phenolica

Binomial name
- Pseudoalteromonas phenolica (Isnansetyo and Kamei 2003)

Species of bacterium

Pseudoalteromonas phenolica is a marine bacterium species in the genus Pseudoalteromonas.

Strain O-BC30 produces MC21-A (3,3′,5,5′-tetrabromo-2,2′-biphenyldiol) while strain O-BC30T produces MC21-B (2,2′,3-tribromo-biphenyl-4-4′-dicarboxylic acid). Those two substances show antibacterial activity against methicillin-resistant Staphylococcus aureus.
