= MC21-B =

Names
- Preferred IUPAC name 2,2′,3-Tribromo[1,1′-biphenyl]-4,4′-dicarboxylic acid
- Other names 2,2′,3-Tribromobiphenyl-4,4′-dicarboxylic acid

Identifiers
3D model (JSmol)	Interactive image
PubChem CID	44181740
CompTox Dashboard (EPA)	DTXSID301028290
- InChI: InChI=1S/C14H7Br3O4/c15-10-5-6(13(18)19)1-2-7(10)8-3-4-9(14(20)21)12(17)11(8)16/h1-5H,(H,18,19)(H,20,21) Key: BTFCVLPFWWMQRI-UHFFFAOYSA-N
- SMILES: OC(=O)c1cc(Br)c(cc1)c2c(Br)c(Br)c(cc2)C(=O)O

Properties
Chemical formula	C_{14}H_{7}Br_{3}O_{4}
Molar mass	478.918 g·mol^{−1}
Appearance	White powder
Solubility in water	Sol. MeOH, CHCl_{3} insol. H_{2}O, hexane
- Except where otherwise noted, data are given for materials in their standard state (at 25 °C [77 °F], 100 kPa). Infobox references

MC21-B is an antibiotic isolated from the O-BC30T strain of a marine bacterium, Pseudoalteromonas phenolica. MC21-B is cytotoxic to human leukaemia cells and human normal dermal fibroblasts.

== See also ==
- MC21-A
