= ShopJimmy.com =

- Type: Private
- Industry: TV Parts, Electronics Parts, Consumer Electronics, Reverse Logistics
- Founded: 2007
- Founder: Jimmy Vosika
- Headquarters: Burnsville, Minnesota, U.S.
- Area served: Worldwide

ShopJimmy.com is an e-commerce company that sells TV parts to businesses and consumers globally. The company started in 2007 and is located in Burnsville, Minnesota, United States. ShopJimmy.com's made the Inc. 500|5000 List in 2011–2015, Forbes' list of "America's Most Promising Companies" (#64) and several regional and industry-related recognitions.

Jimmy Vosika founded ShopJimmy.com out of his garage, selling reclaimed flatscreen TVs on eBay. After discovering the value of the parts inside those TVs, Jimmy quickly adapted the business to sell TV parts on eBay. He soon migrated the business to its own site, ShopJimmy.com, and created a TV teardown system to harvest TV parts more efficiently and reduce electronic waste (e-waste) by recycling almost 100% of each TV. In 2010, Jimmy nabbed Ernst & Young's Entrepreneur of the Year Award (Upper Midwest, Distribution).

In August 2012, ShopJimmy acquired Illinois-based competitor Discount TV Parts. Similarly, in January 2013, ShopJimmy acquired Minnesota-based Ness Electronics, a long-time distributor of DLP lamps, TV parts and components, and CE products.

ShopJimmy currently has an inventory of over 500,000 TV parts. ShopJimmy also sells refurbished TVs, universal TV stands, TV board components, and offers various TV board repair services. The company is also ISO 9001 and ISO 14001 certified.

ShopJimmy.com started a home improvement retail outlet, MN Home Outlet, in 2014 in Burnsville, MN. MN Home Outlet sells home improvement items, appliances, lawn and garden, patio furniture, home goods, tools, TVs and more direct from major retailers at up to 90% off retail. In December 2017, MN Home Outlet opened its second location in Coon Rapids, MN. In January 2018, the retailer opened its third location in Woodbury, MN.
