= Data commingling =

Data commingling, in computer science, occurs when different items or kinds of data are stored in such a way that they become commonly accessible when they are supposed to remain separated. In cloud computing, this can occur where different customer data sits on the same server. Data that is commingled can present a security vulnerability.

Data commingling can also occur due to high speed data transmission mixing. In this situation, data of one security level can inadvertently or purposely be mixed with data of a lower or higher security level on the same transmission portal. Portal vehicles can be wire, fiber optics, microwave or various radio frequency transmission portals. This commingling can cause breaches of security and become a source of legal issues to any entity, corporation or individual.

Data commingling can also occur when personal computers and personal software programs are used for business, security, government, etc. uses. In the early formulation stages of entities, non-profit or profit corporations, LLC's, LLP's, etc., the creation and use of stand-alone computers and stand-alone networks, "absolutely unconnected" to involved individuals, is the easiest, and safest way to prevent Data Commingling.
