= Electronic waste =

Discarded electronic devices

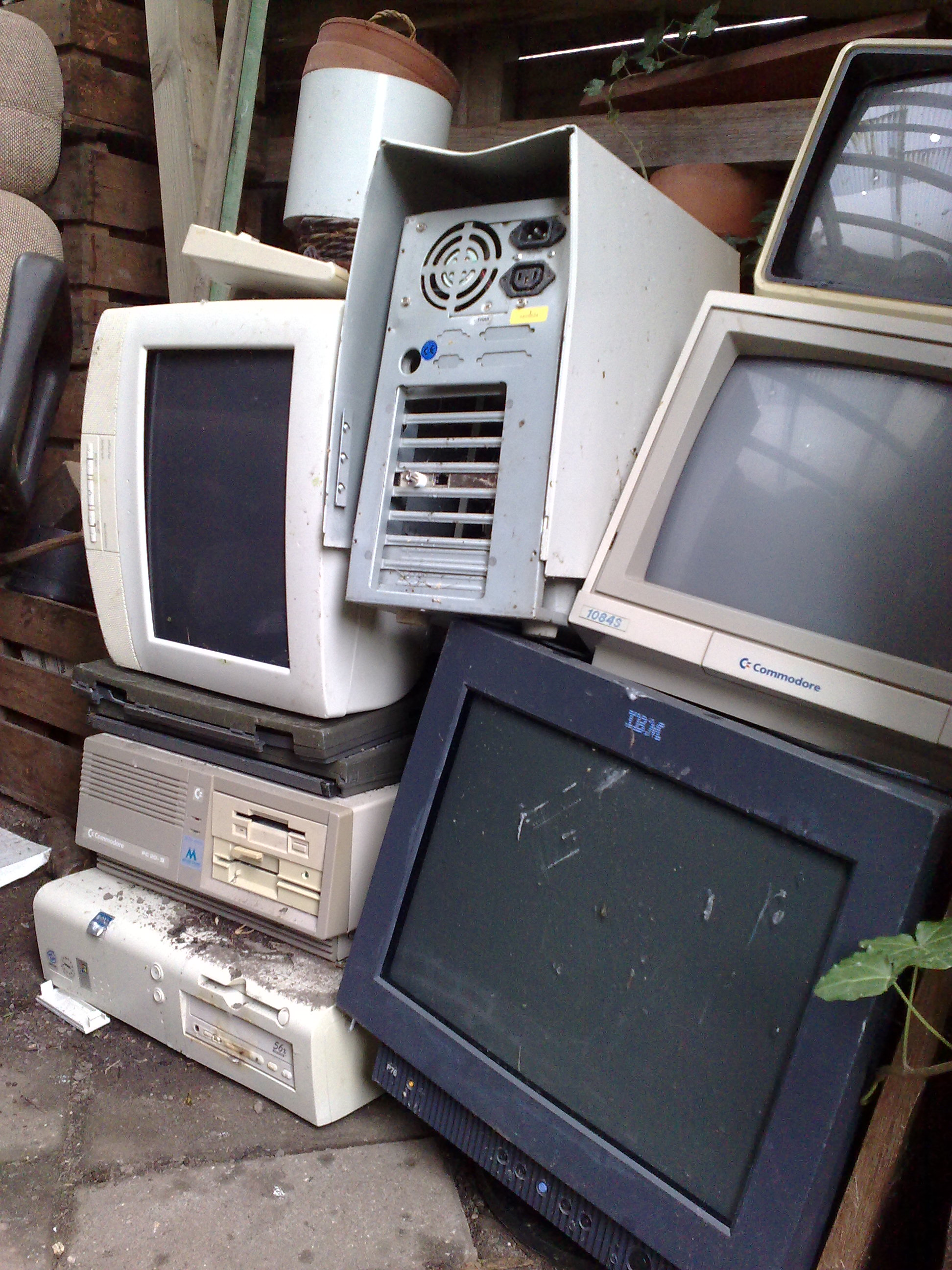
Defective and obsolete electronic equipment

Electronic waste, also known as waste electrical and electronic equipment (WEEE), end-of-life (EOL) electronics, or simply e-waste, describes discarded electrical or electronic devices. Electronic waste is one of the fastest-growing waste streams globally, driven by rapid technological advancement and increasing consumption of electronic devices. In 2022, approximately 62 million tonnes of electronic waste were generated globally, making it one of the fastest growing waste streams; only 22.3% were formally collected and recycled. Global e-waste generation is projected to reach 82 million tonnes by 2030. Used electronics which are destined for refurbishment, reuse, resale, salvage recycling through material recovery, or disposal are also considered e-waste. Informal processing of e-waste in developing countries can lead to adverse human health effects and environmental pollution. The growing consumption of electronic goods due to the Digital Revolution and innovations in science and technology, such as bitcoin, has led to a global e-waste problem and hazard. The rapid exponential increase in e-waste is due to frequent new-model releases, unnecessary purchases of electrical and electronic equipment (EEE), short innovation cycles, low recycling rates, and a drop in the average lifespan of computers.

Electronic scrap components, such as CPUs, contain potentially harmful materials such as lead, cadmium, beryllium, or brominated flame retardants. Recycling and disposal of e-waste may involve significant risk to the health of workers and their communities.

== Definitions ==
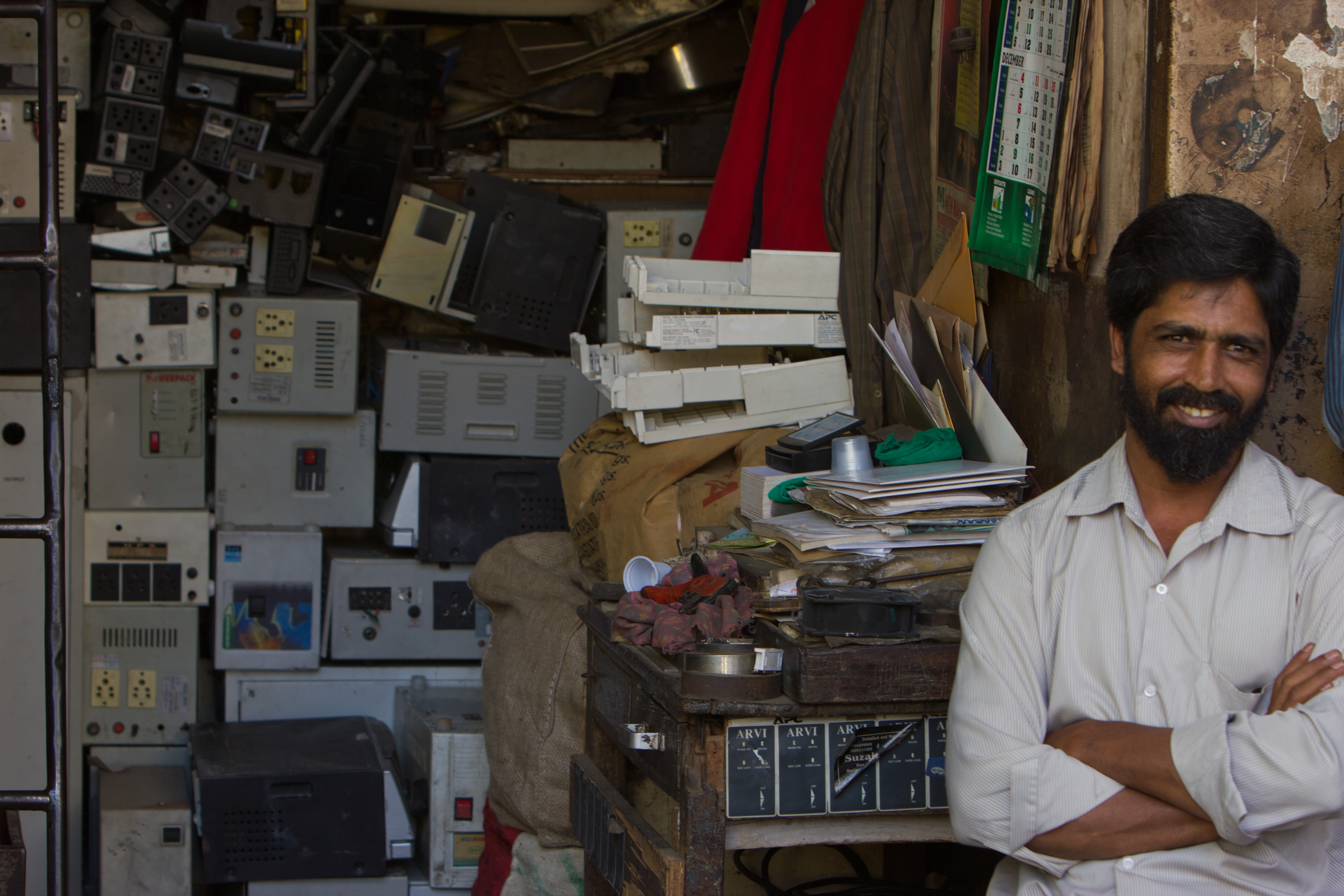
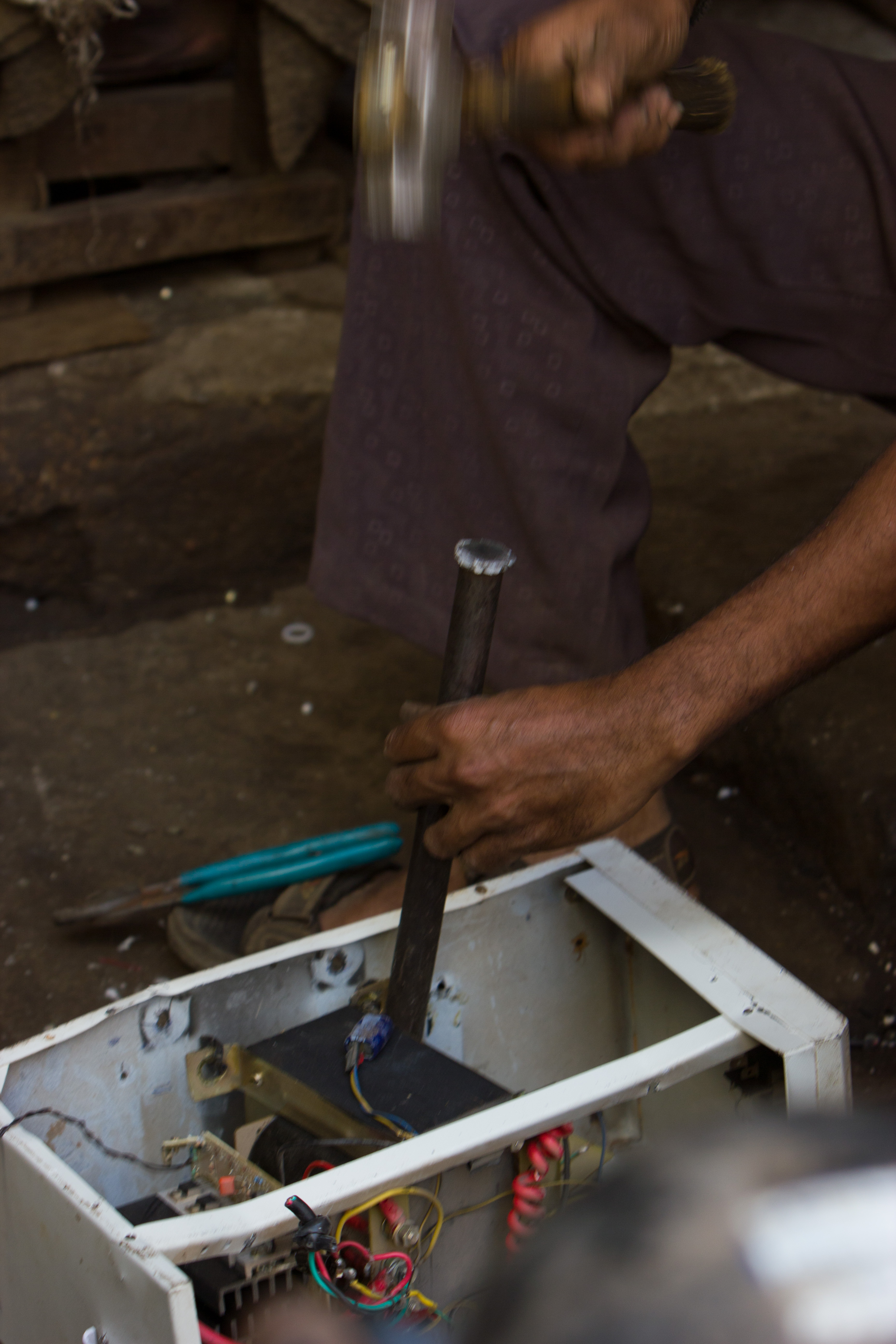
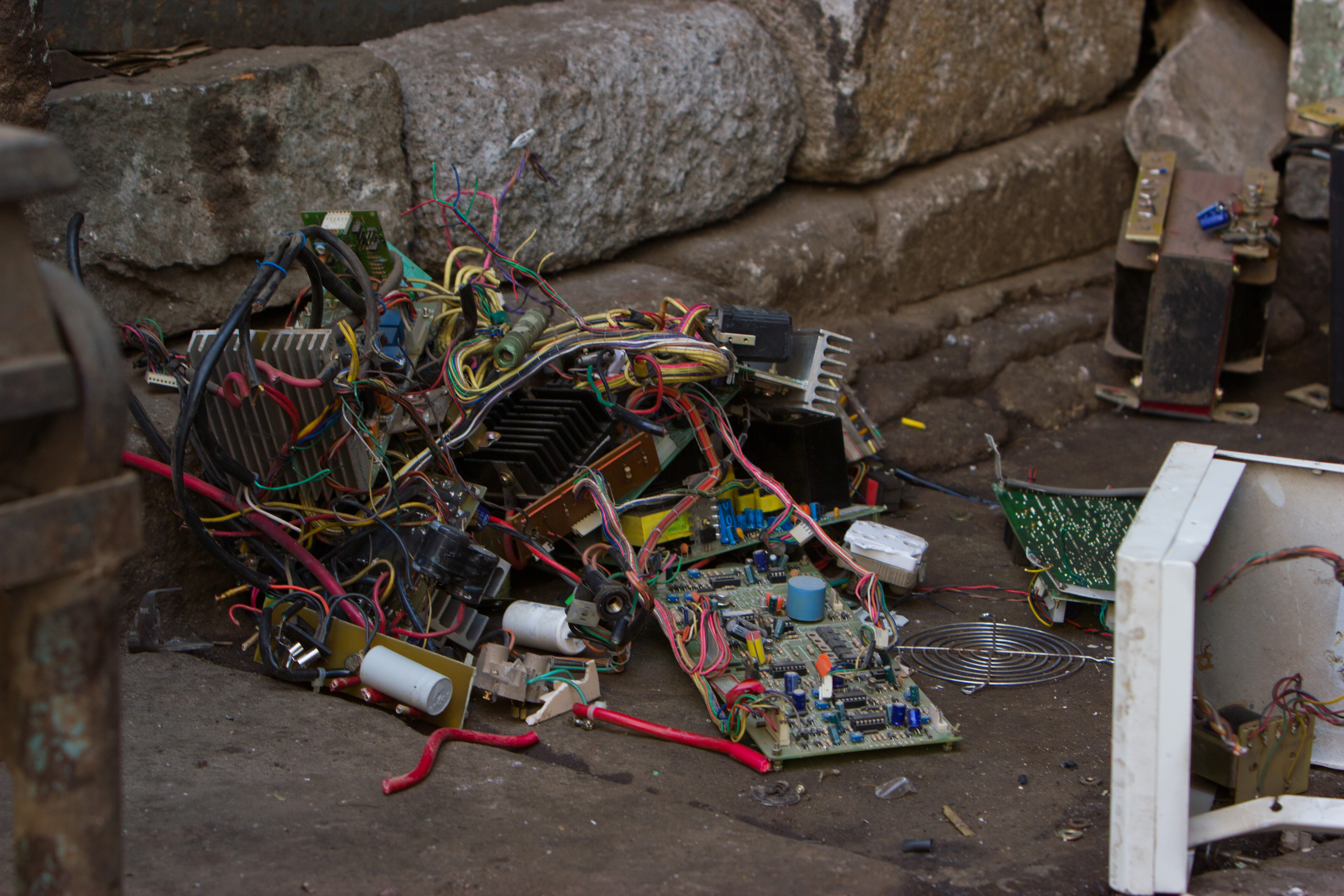
Hoarding (first), disassembling (second), and collecting (third) electronic waste in Bengaluru, India

When an electronic product is discarded after its useful life, it becomes electronic waste, or e-waste.

The European Union (EU) classifies e-waste into ten categories (EU-10):

1. Large household appliances
2. Small household appliances
3. IT and telecommunications equipment
4. Consumer equipment and photovoltaic panels
5. Lighting equipment
6. Electrical and electronic tools
7. Toys, leisure, and sports equipment
8. Medical devices
9. Monitoring and control instruments
10. Automatic dispensers

These include used electronics destined for reuse, resale, salvage, recycling, or disposal, as well as reusables (working and repairable electronics) and secondary raw materials (such as copper, steel, plastic, and similar materials). The term "waste" is reserved for residue or material that is dumped by the buyer rather than recycled, including residue from reuse and recycling operations, because loads of surplus electronics are frequently commingled (good, recyclable, and non-recyclable). Several public policy advocates use the terms "e-waste" and "e-scrap" broadly to encompass all surplus electronics. Cathode ray tubes (CRTs) are among the hardest types to recycle.

Using a different set of categories, the Partnership on Measuring ICT for Development defines e-waste in six categories:

1. Temperature exchange equipment (such as air conditioners, freezers)
2. Screens, monitors (TVs, laptops)
3. Lamps (LED lamps, for example)
4. Large equipment (washing machines, electric stoves)
5. Small equipment (microwaves, electric shavers)
6. Small IT and telecommunication equipment (such as mobile phones, printers)

Products in each category vary in longevity profile, impact, and collection methods, among other differences. Around 70% of toxic waste in landfills is electronic waste, even though e-waste accounts for only 3% of the waste in landfills.

CRTs have a relatively high concentration of lead and phosphors (not to be confused with phosphorus), both of which are necessary for the display. The United States Environmental Protection Agency (EPA) includes discarded CRT monitors in its category of "hazardous household waste" but considers CRTs that have been set aside for testing to be commodities if they are recycled or exported for recycling, under certain conditions. These CRT devices are often confused with the DLP Rear Projection TV, both of which have a different recycling process due to the materials of which they are composed.

The EU and its member states operate a system through the European Waste Catalogue (EWC) – a European Council Directive implemented as "member state law". In the UK, this is set out in the List of Wastes Directive. However, the list (and EWC) provides a broad definition (EWC Code 16 02 13*) of what constitutes hazardous electronic waste, requiring "waste operators" to consult the Hazardous Waste Regulations (Annex 1A, Annex 1B) for a more refined definition. Constituent materials in the waste also require assessment via the combination of Annex II and Annex III, again allowing operators to further determine whether waste is hazardous.

Some exporters are accused of leaving difficult-to-recycle, obsolete, or non-repairable equipment mixed with loads of working equipment (for various reasons, mostly to cut costs for separation and treatment). Protectionists may broaden the definition of "waste" electronics to protect domestic markets from working secondary equipment.

The high value of the computer recycling subset of electronic waste (working and reusable laptops, desktops, and components like RAM) can help pay the cost of transportation for a larger number of worthless pieces than can be achieved with display devices, which have less (or negative) scrap value. A 2011 report, "Ghana E-waste Country Assessment", found that of 215,000 tons of electronics imported to Ghana, 30% was brand new and 70% was used. Of the used product, the study concluded that 15% was not reused and was scrapped or discarded. This contrasts with published but uncredited claims that 80% of the imports into Ghana were being burned in primitive conditions.

== Quantity ==
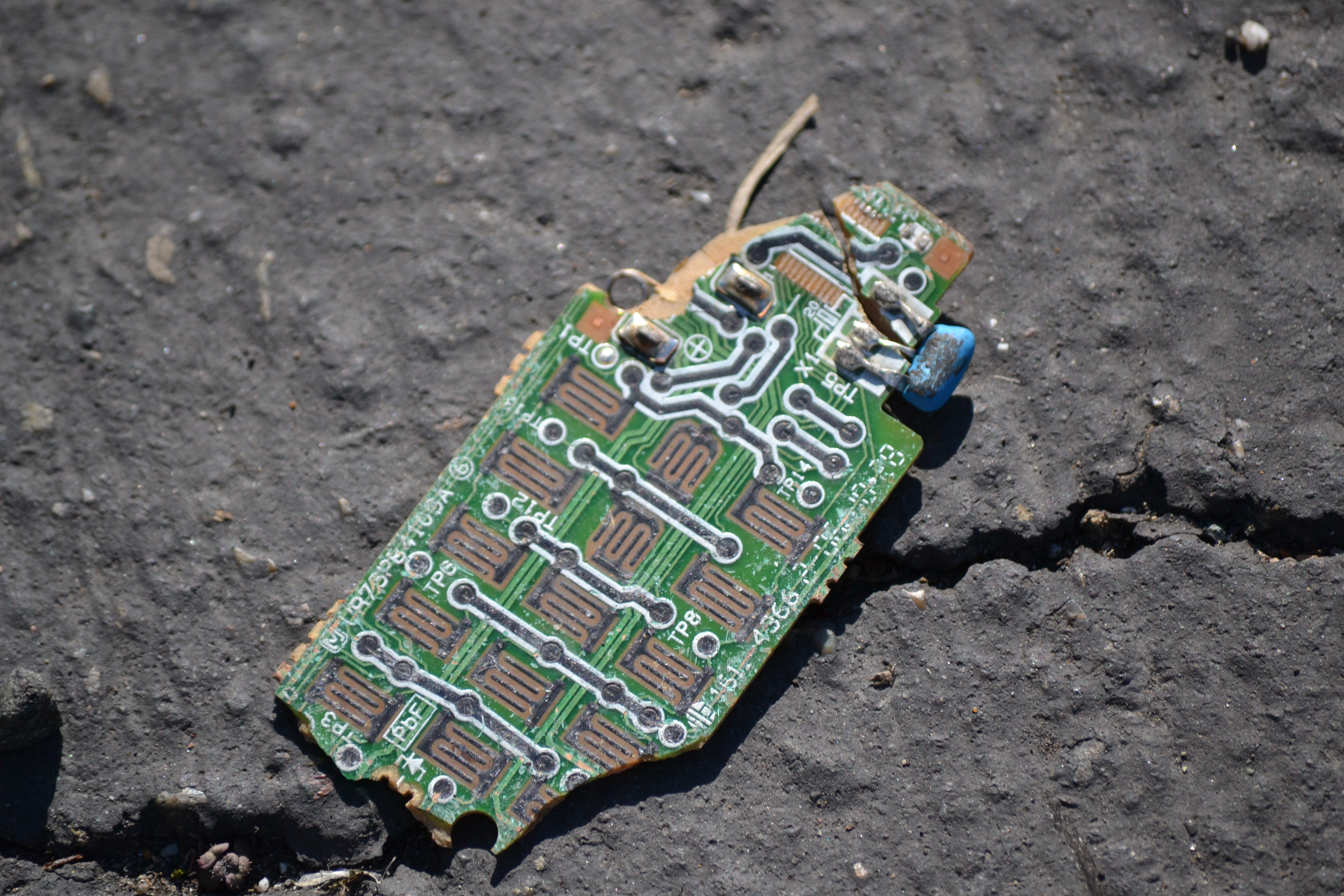
A fragment of a discarded circuit board from a television remote.

E-waste is considered the "fastest-growing waste stream in the world". A study in 2024 highlights that nearly 62 million tons are generated globally every year with only 22.3% formally documented as being collected and recycled, with the rest often processed informally in developing countries, posing serious health and environmental risks. An estimated US$62 billion of key raw materials are lost annually, due to inadequate recycling efforts.

Rapid technological change, constant innovation, shifts in media (tapes, software, MP3s), falling prices, and planned obsolescence have resulted in a rapidly growing surplus of electronic waste worldwide. Truly circular technical solutions are very limited, but in most cases, a legal framework, collection, logistics, and other services need to be in place before a technical solution can be applied.

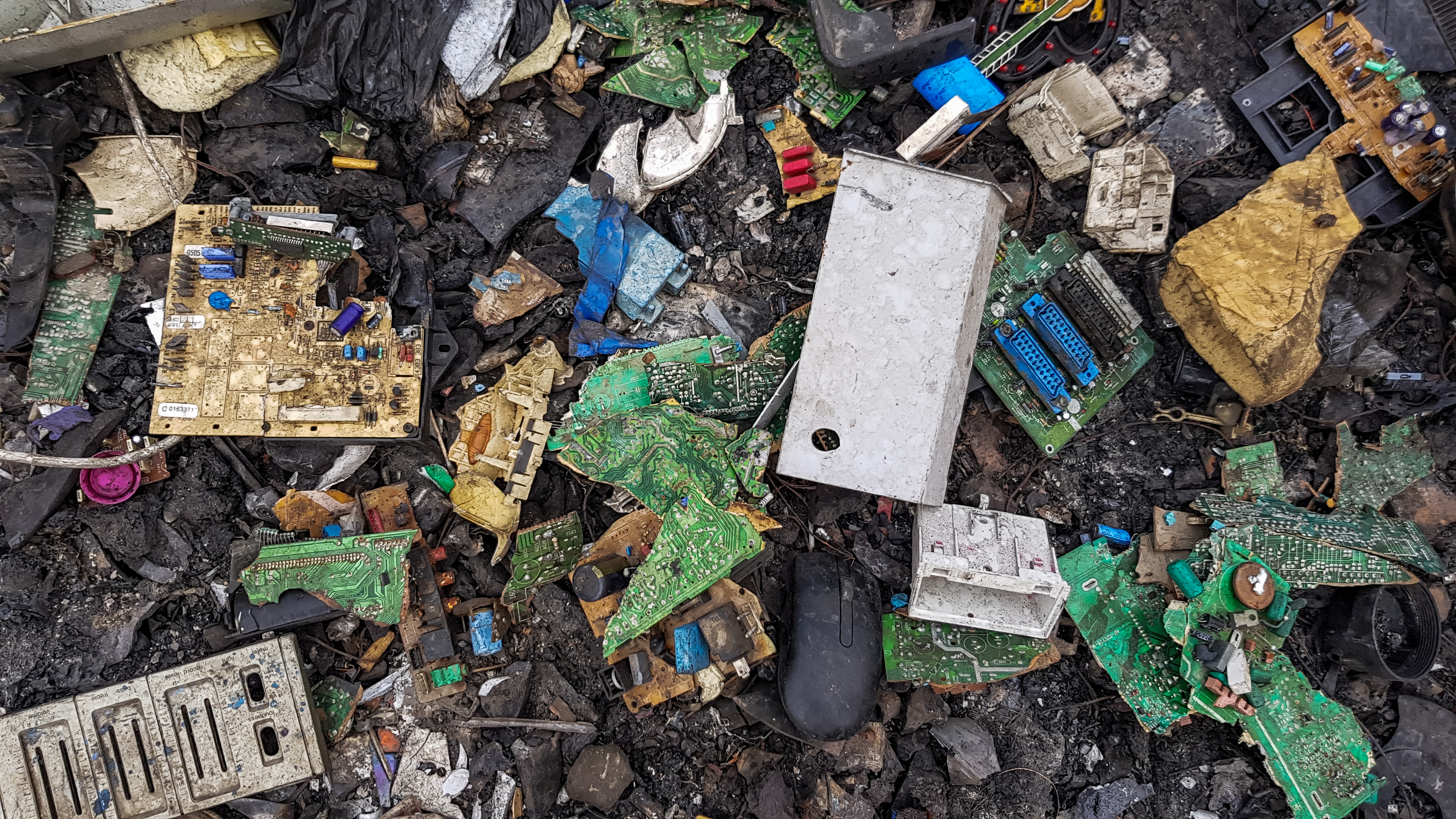
Electronic waste at Agbogbloshie, Ghana

According to a report by UNEP titled, "Recycling – from e-waste to Resources," the amount of e-waste being produced – including mobile phones and computers – could rise by as much as 500 percent over the next decade in some countries, such as India. The United States is the world leader in producing electronic waste, tossing away about 3 million tons each year. China already produces about 10.1 million tons (2020 estimate) domestically, second only to the United States. And, despite having banned e-waste imports, China remains a major e-waste dumping ground for developed countries.

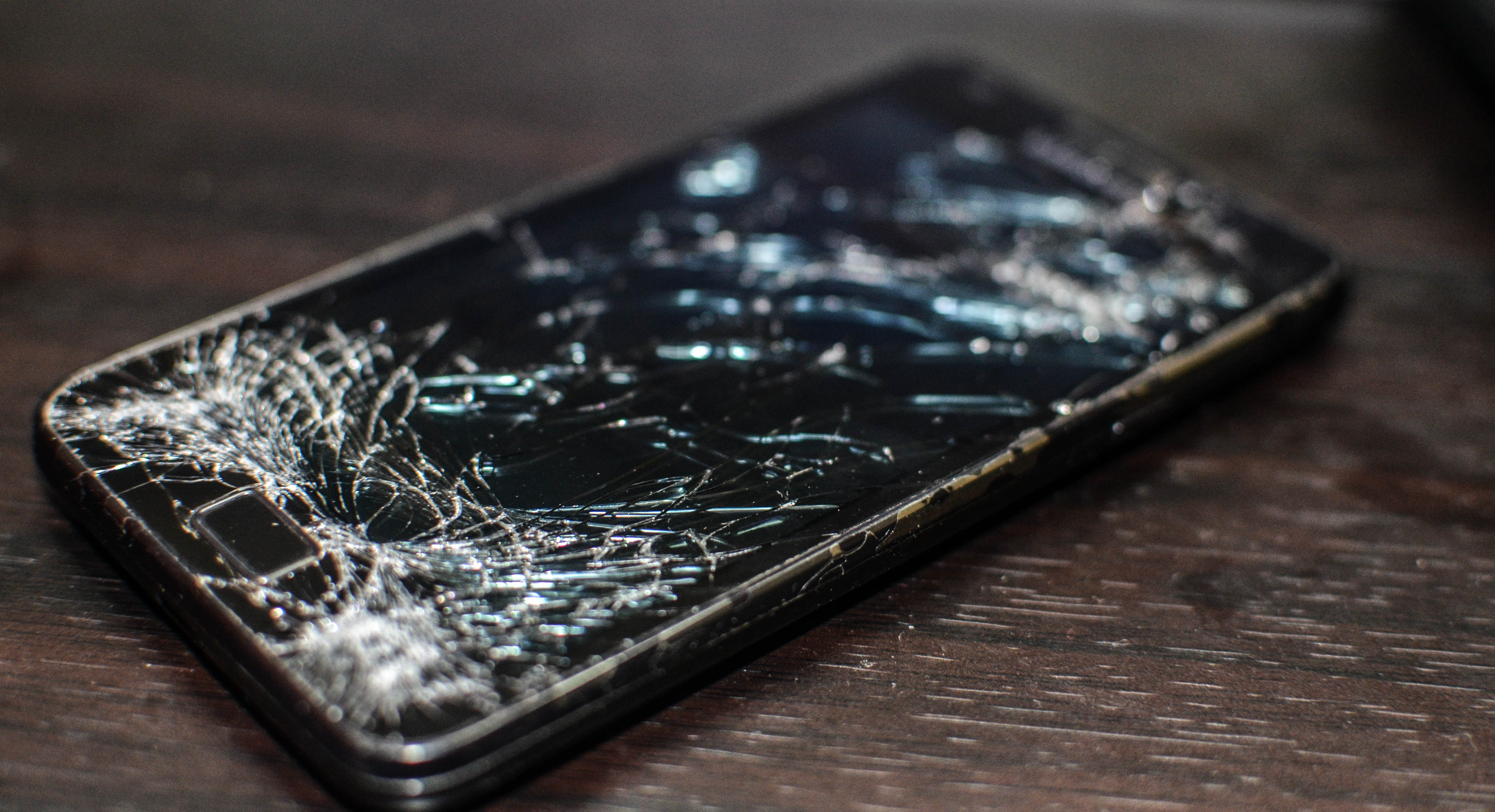
A smartphone with a cracked screen is regarded as a common electronic waste in cities

A record 62 million tonnes (Mt) of e-waste was generated globally in 2022, an 82% increase from 2010, and the figure is projected to reach 82 million tonnes by 2030. In the United States, an estimated 70% of heavy metals in landfills comes from discarded electronics.

While there is agreement that the number of discarded electronic devices is increasing, there is considerable disagreement about the relative risk (compared to automobile scrap, for example), and strong disagreement about whether curtailing trade in used electronics will improve conditions or make them worse. According to an article in Motherboard, attempts to restrict the trade have driven reputable companies out of the supply chain, with unintended consequences.

== Global trade issues ==
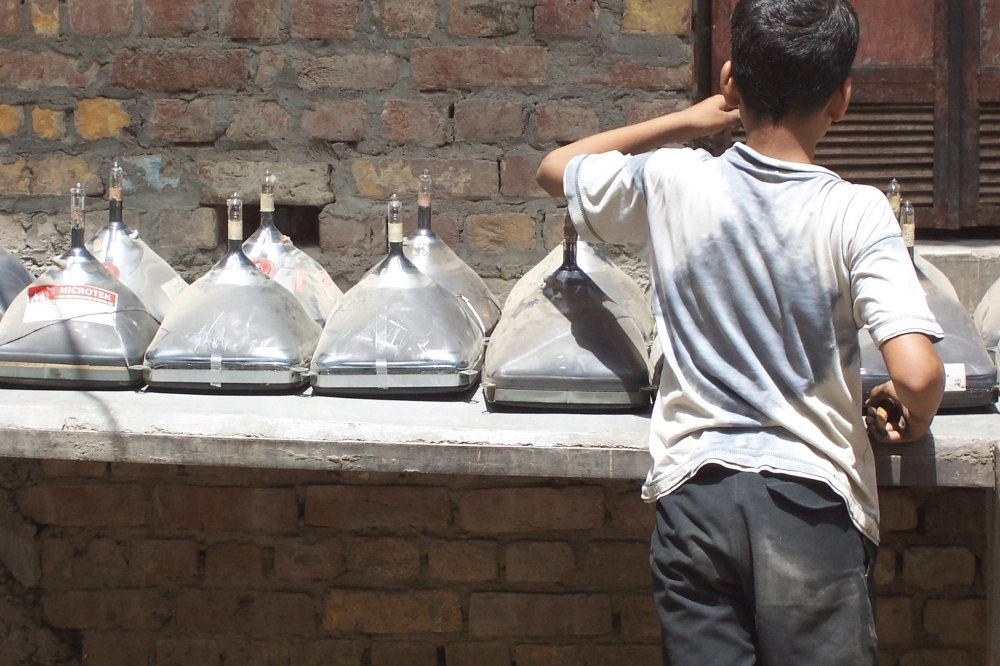
Electronic waste is often exported to developing countries.

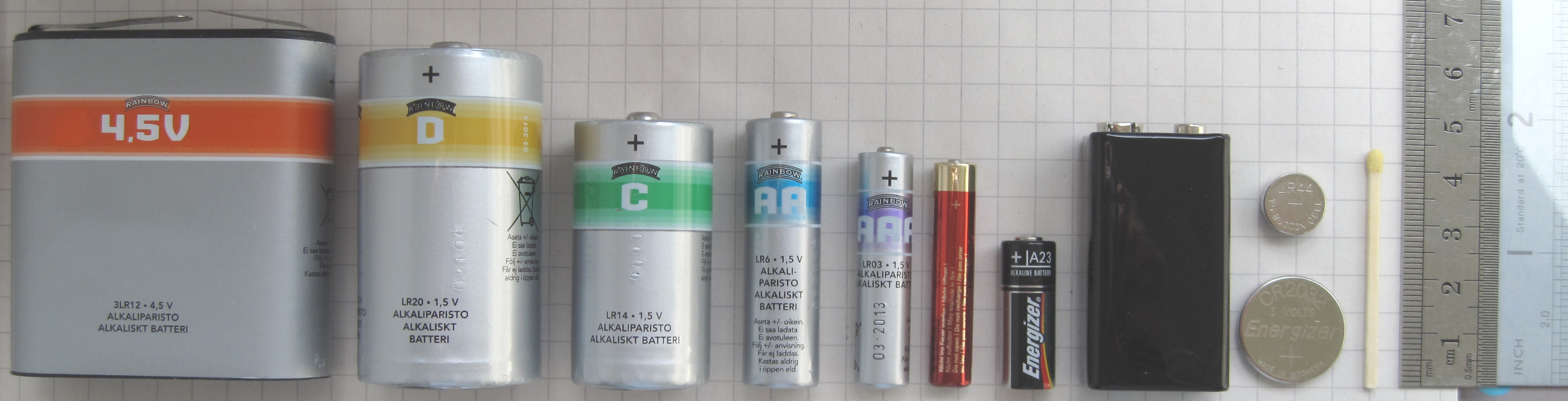
4.5-volt, D, C, AA, AAA, AAAA, A23, 9-volt, CR2032, and LR44 cells are all recyclable in most countries.

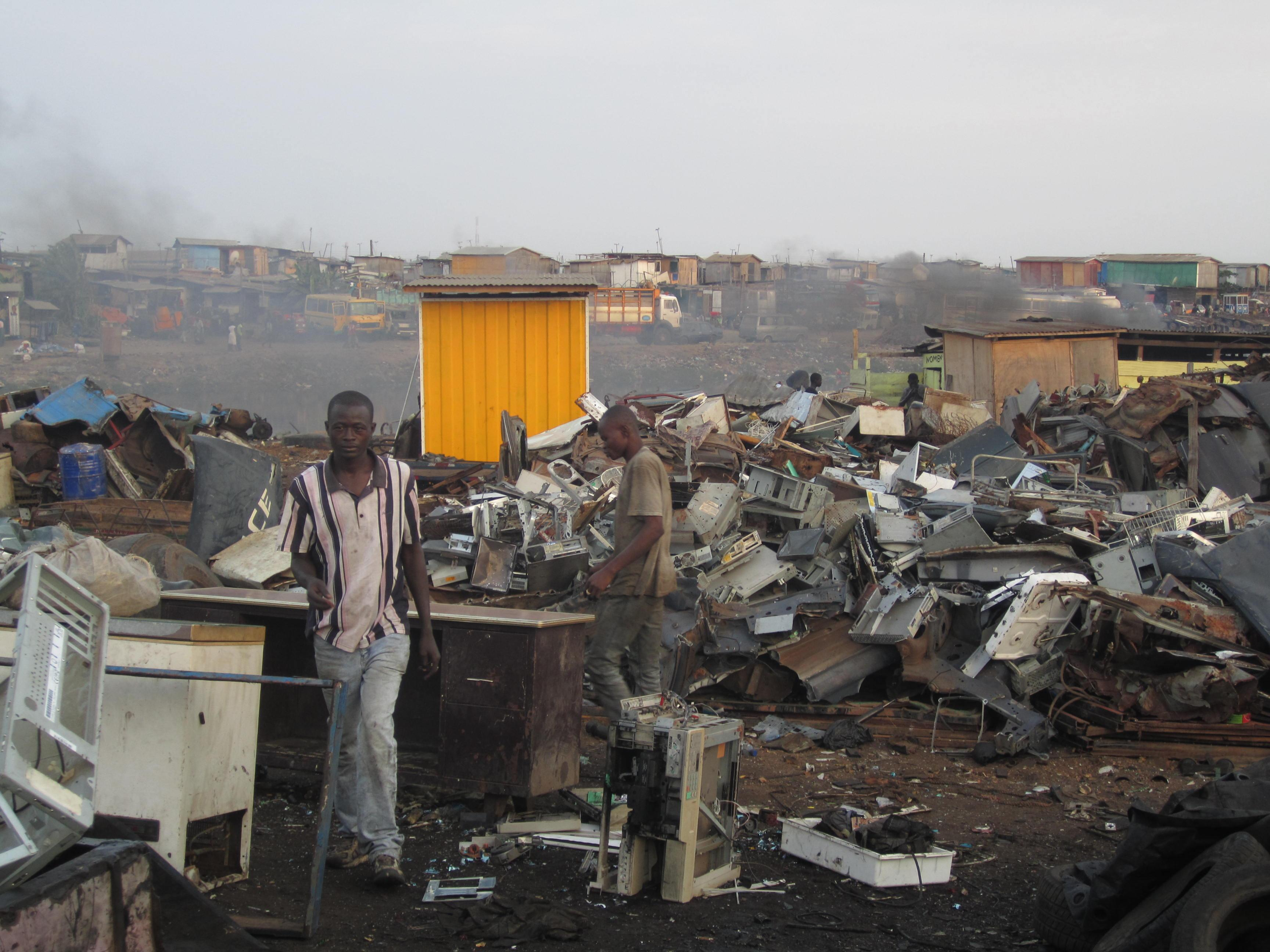
The e-waste center of Agbogbloshie, Ghana, where electronic waste is burnt and disassembled with no safety or environmental considerations

One theory is that increased regulation of electronic waste and concern over the environmental harm in nature economies creates an economic disincentive to remove residues before export. Critics of trade in used electronics maintain that it is still too easy for brokers calling themselves recyclers to export unscreened electronic waste to developing countries, such as China, India and parts of Africa, thus avoiding the expense of removing items like bad cathode ray tubes (the processing of which is expensive and difficult). Developing countries have become toxic dumping grounds for e-waste. Developing countries that receive foreign e-waste often go further by repairing and recycling forsaken equipment. Yet still 90% of e-waste ended up in landfills in developing countries in 2003. Proponents of international trade point to the success of fair trade programs in other industries, where cooperation has led to the creation of sustainable jobs and can bring affordable technology in countries where repair and reuse rates are higher.

Some supporters of the used-electronics trade say that metal extraction from virgin mining has been shifted to developing countries. Recycling copper, silver, gold, and other materials from discarded electronic devices is considered better for the environment than mining. They also state that the repair and reuse of computers and televisions have become a "lost art" in wealthier nations, and that refurbishing has traditionally been a development path.

South Korea, Taiwan, and southern China all excelled at finding "retained value" in used goods and, in some cases, have set up billion-dollar industries refurbishing used ink cartridges, single-use cameras, and working CRTs. Refurbishing has traditionally been a threat to established manufacturing, and simple protectionism helps explain some of the criticism of the trade. Works like "The Waste Makers" by Vance Packard explain some of the criticism of exports of working products, for example, the ban on import of tested working Pentium 4 laptops to China, or the bans on export of used surplus working electronics by Japan.

Opponents of surplus electronics exports argue that lower environmental and labor standards, cheap labor, and the relatively high value of recovered raw materials lead to the transfer of pollution-generating activities, such as copper wire smelting. Electronic waste is often sent to various African and Asian countries, such as China, Malaysia, India, and Kenya, for processing, sometimes illegally. Many surplus laptops are routed to developing nations as "dumping grounds for e-waste".

The Basel Convention was adopted in March 1989 and is a primary global treaty that aims to regulate the transboundary movement of hazardous waste to protect countries that import such waste. The United States has not ratified the Basel Convention or its Ban Amendment, and thus has few domestic federal laws forbidding the export of toxic waste—the Basel Action Network estimates that about 80% of the electronic waste directed to recycling in the U.S. does not get recycled there at all, but is put on container ships and sent to countries such as China. This figure is disputed as an exaggeration by the EPA, the Institute of Scrap Recycling Industries, and the World Reuse, Repair and Recycling Association.

Independent research by Arizona State University showed that 87–88% of imported used computers were priced above the constituent materials they contained, and that "the official trade in end-of-life computers is thus driven by reuse as opposed to recycling".

== Basel Convention obstacles ==
The Basel Convention and Ban Amendment face regulatory obstacles across nations. First, there is often a lack of waste reporting from Parties due to not having ratified the Basel Convention or low- and middle-income countries (LMICs) primarily using informal recycling and collection procedures. In the 2024 UNEP report of the sixteenth meeting of the Basel Convention, it was mentioned that 27 Parties did not submit national reports from 2018 to 2022 about their compliance to the Basel Convention's legal implementation. These Parties included Belize, Cambodia, Chile, Djibouti, Dominica, Somalia, Tonga, Mauritius, Nepal, Palau, Papua New Guinea, Paraguay, Angola, Botswana, Comoros, Cameroon, Kazakhstan, Kiribati, Lao Peoples' Democratic Republic, Liechtenstein, Sierra Leone, Senegal, Samoa, Republic of Korea, Uruguay, Saint Kitts and Nevis, and Zambia.

There is also vague language in reports and legislation, as 68 of 126 Parties at the sixteenth meeting defined illegal traffic. E-waste may be exported under the guise of second-hand or used materials, which reduces the effectiveness of the Basel Convention by creating loopholes in its language.

Further, the Basel Convention leaves the responsibility of waste monitoring and enforcing consequences for violations up to the Parties themselves. In the sixteenth meeting, it was found that 66 Parties implemented provisions to take back hazardous waste, and 52 Parties treated the illegal trafficking of hazardous waste between nations as a criminal offense. While these data represent overall hazardous waste, not just e-waste, electronic waste is still included in these statistics. The hindrances posed by the Basel Convention and the Ban Amendment allow LMICs to import large amounts of e-waste through global trade, leading to harmful effects on community health in those regions.

=== Trade ===
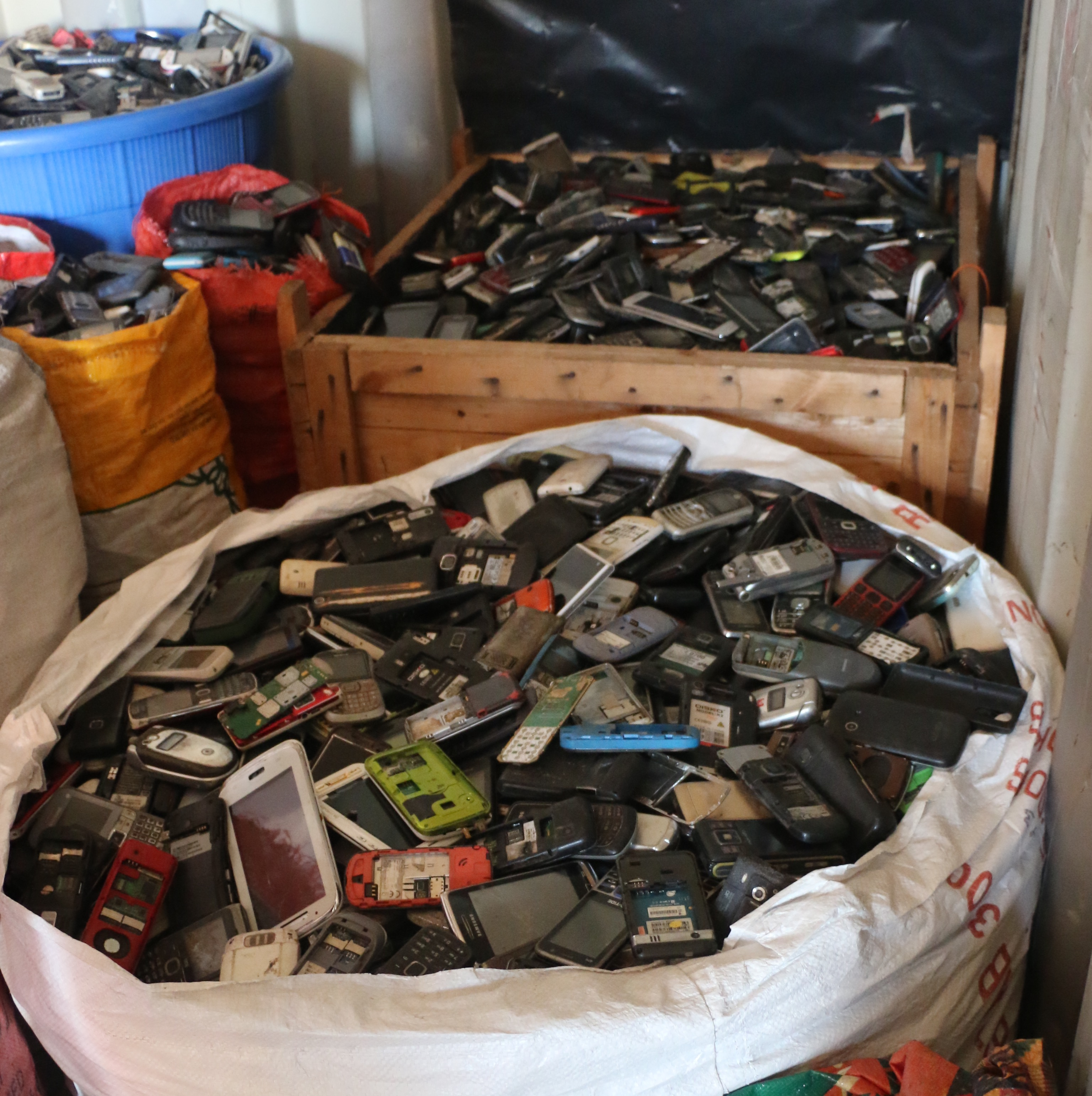
Sacks of mobile phones in Agbogbloshie, Ghana.

Proponents of the trade say the growth of internet access is more strongly correlated with trade than with poverty. Haiti is poor and closer to the port of New York than Southeast Asia, but far more electronic waste is exported from New York to Asia than to Haiti. Thousands of men, women, and children are employed in reuse, refurbishing, repair, and remanufacturing in unsustainable industries that are in decline in developed countries. Denying developing nations access to used electronics may deny them sustainable employment, affordable products, and internet access, or force them to deal with even less scrupulous suppliers. In a series of seven articles for The Atlantic, Shanghai-based reporter Adam Minter describes many of these computer repair and scrap separation activities as objectively sustainable.

Opponents of the trade argue that developing countries utilize methods that are more harmful and more wasteful. A common and expedient method is to toss equipment onto an open fire to melt plastics and burn off non-valuable metals. This releases carcinogens and neurotoxins into the air, contributing to an acrid, lingering smog. These noxious fumes include dioxins and furans. Bonfire refuse can be quickly disposed of in drainage ditches or waterways that feed the ocean or local water supplies.

In June 2008, a container of electronic waste, destined from the Port of Oakland in the U.S. to Sanshui District in mainland China, was intercepted in Hong Kong by Greenpeace. Concern over exports of electronic waste were raised in press reports in India, Ghana, Côte d'Ivoire, and Nigeria.

The research that was undertaken by the Countering WEEE Illegal Trade (CWIT) project, funded by the European Commission, found that in Europe only 35% (3.3 million tons) of all the e-waste discarded in 2012 ended up in the officially reported amounts of collection and recycling systems. The other 65% (6.15 million tons) was either:

- Exported (1.5 million tons),
- Recycled under non-compliant conditions in Europe (3.15 million tons),
- Scavenged for valuable parts (750,000 tons), or
- Thrown in waste bins (750,000 tons).

=== Guiyu ===
Guiyu in the Guangdong region of China is a massive electronic-waste-processing community. It is often referred to as the "e-waste capital of the world." Traditionally, Guiyu was an agricultural community; however, in the mid-1990s, it transformed into an e-waste recycling center, with over 75% of local households and an additional 100,000 migrant workers involved. Thousands of individual workshops employ laborers to snip cables, pry chips from circuit boards, grind plastic computer cases into particles, and dip circuit boards in acid baths to dissolve the precious metals. Others work to strip insulation from all wiring in an attempt to salvage tiny amounts of copper wire. Uncontrolled burning, disassembly, and disposal has led to many environmental problems such as groundwater contamination, atmospheric pollution, and water pollution either by immediate discharge or from surface runoff (especially near coastal areas), as well as health problems including occupational safety and health effects among those directly and indirectly involved, due to the methods of processing the waste.

Six of the many villages in Guiyu specialize in circuit-board disassembly, seven in plastics and metals reprocessing, and two in wire and cable disassembly. Greenpeace, an environmental group, sampled dust, soil, river sediment, and groundwater in Guiyu. They found very high levels of toxic heavy metals and organic contaminants in both places. Lai Yun, a campaigner for the group found "over 10 poisonous metals, such as lead, mercury, and cadmium."

Guiyu is only one example of a digital dump, but similar sites can be found around the world, including Nigeria, Ghana, and India.

=== Other informal e-waste recycling sites ===
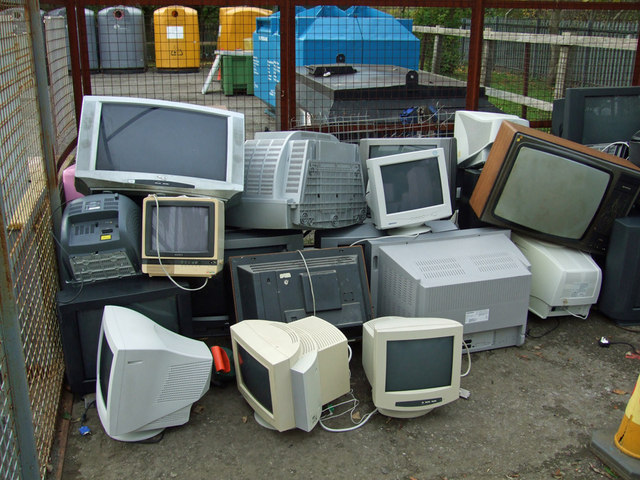
A pile of discarded CRT TVs and computer monitors.

Guiyu is likely one of the oldest and largest informal e-waste recycling sites in the world; however, there are many sites worldwide, including India, Ghana (Agbogbloshie), Nigeria, and the Philippines. There are a handful of studies that describe exposure levels in e-waste workers, the community, and the environment. For example, locals and migrant workers in Delhi, a northern union territory of India, scavenge discarded computer equipment and extract base metals using toxic, unsafe methods. Bangalore, located in southern India, is often referred as the "Silicon Valley of India" and has a growing informal e-waste recycling sector. A study found that e-waste workers in the slum community had higher levels of V, Cr, Mn, Mo, Sn, Tl, and Pb than workers at an e-waste recycling facility.

=== Cryptocurrency e-waste ===
Bitcoin mining has also contributed to increased electronic waste. Bitcoin and other cryptocurrencies can be used for payment or speculation. Per de Vries & Stoll in the journal Resources, Conservation and Recycling, the average bitcoin transaction yields 272 grams of electronic waste and generated approximately 112.5 million grams of waste in 2020 alone. Other estimates indicate that the bitcoin network discards as much "small IT and telecommunication equipment waste produced by a country like the Netherlands," totaling to 30.7 metric kilotons every year. Furthermore, the rate at which Bitcoin disposes of its waste exceeds that of major financial organizations such as VISA, which produces 40 grams of waste for every 100,000 transactions.

A major concern is the rapid technological turnover in the bitcoin industry, which results in high levels of e-waste. This can be attributed to the proof-of-work principle bitcoin employs where miners receive currency as a reward for being the first to decode the hashes that encode its blockchain. As such, miners are encouraged to compete with one another to decode the hash first. Computing these hashes requires massive computing power, which drives miners to increase their processing power by purchasing ever-more advanced computer chips. Most computer chips used to mine Bitcoin are application-specific integrated circuits (ASIC chips), whose sole function is to mine Bitcoin, and they cannot be repurposed or reused.

The bitcoin e-waste problem is further exacerbated by the fact that many countries and corporations lack recycling programs for ASIC chips. Developing a recycling infrastructure for bitcoin mining may prove to be beneficial, though, as the aluminum heat sinks and metal casings in ASIC chips can be recycled into new technology. Much of this responsibility falls onto Bitmain, the leading manufacturer of bitcoin, which currently lacks the infrastructure to recycle waste from bitcoin mining. Without such programs, much of bitcoin waste ends up in landfill along with 83.6% of the global total of e-waste.

Many argue for relinquishing the proof-of-work model altogether in favor of the proof-of-stake one. This model selects a single miner to validate transactions on the blockchain, rather than having all miners compete for the right to do so. With no competition, the processing speed of miners' rigs would not matter. Any device could be used for validating the blockchain, so there would be no incentive to use single-use ASIC chips or continually purchase new ones and dispose of old ones.

== Environmental impact ==
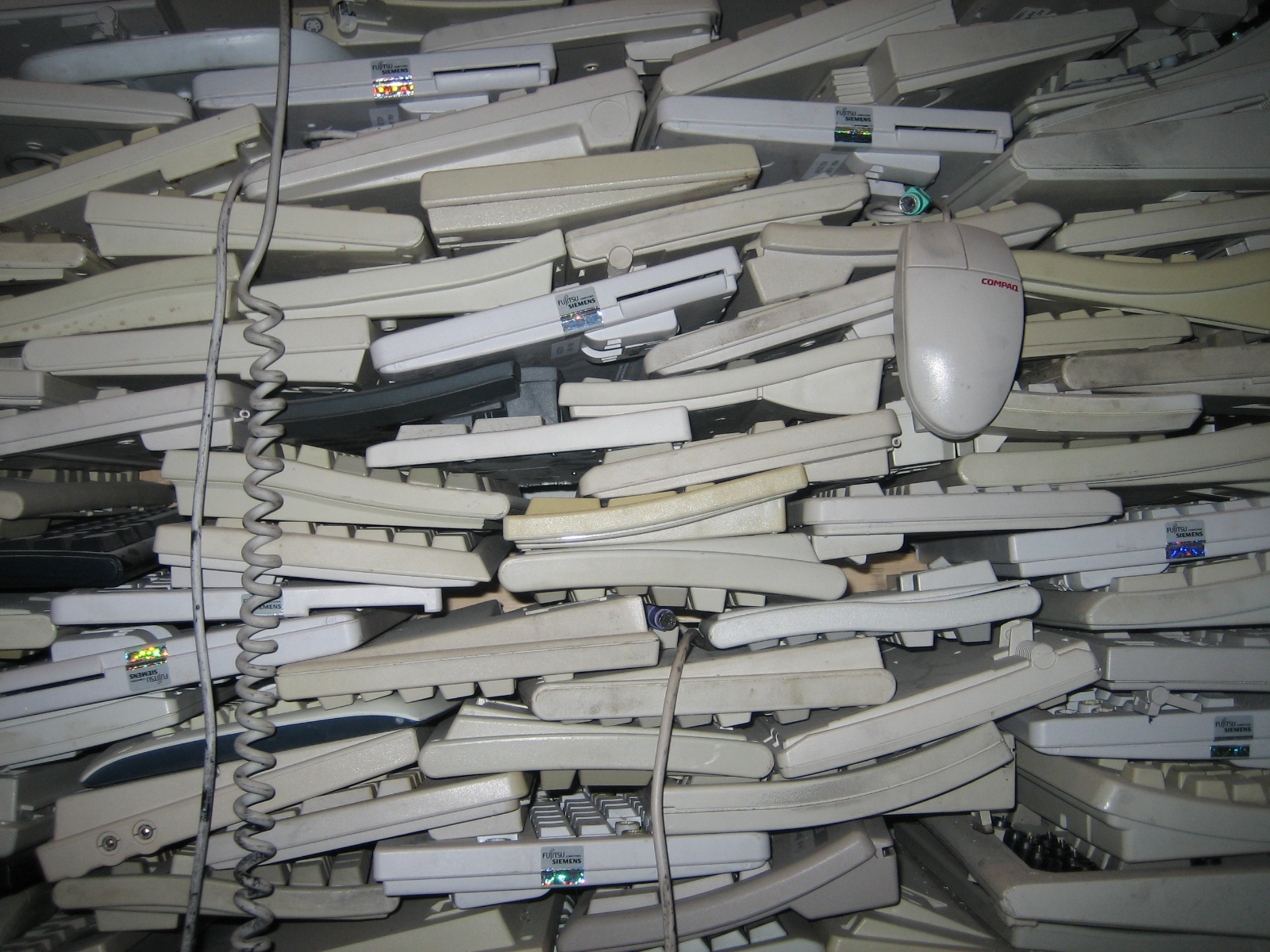
Old keyboards and a mouse.

The processes of dismantling and disposing of electronic waste in developing countries led to many environmental impacts. Liquid and atmospheric releases end up in bodies of water, groundwater, soil, and air, and therefore in land and sea animals – both domesticated and wild, in crops eaten by both animals and humans, and in drinking water.

One study of environmental effects in Guiyu, China, found the following:

- Airborne dioxins – one type found at 100 times the levels previously measured
- Levels of carcinogens in duck ponds and rice paddies exceeded international standards for agricultural areas, and cadmium, copper, nickel, and lead levels in rice paddies were above international standards
- Heavy metals found in road dust – lead over 300 times that of a control village's road dust and copper over 100 times

In the Agbogbloshie area of Ghana, about 215,000 tons of secondhand consumer electronics are imported annually. Because this region has considerable overlap among industrial, commercial, and residential zones, Pure Earth, formerly Blacksmith Institute, ranked Agbogbloshie in 2013 as one of the world's 10 worst toxic threats. Improper disposal of electronic waste contributes to the release of contaminants into soil, water, and air, allowing pollutants to spread through multiple environmental pathways and increasing the risk of ecological and human exposure.

A separate study at the Agbogbloshie e-waste dump in Ghana found lead levels as high as 18,125 ppm in the soil. The US EPA standard for lead in soil in play areas is 400 ppm and 1200 ppm for non-play areas. Scrap workers at the Agbogbloshie e-waste dump regularly burn electronic components and auto harness wires for copper recovery, releasing toxic chemicals like lead, dioxins and furans into the environment.

Researchers such as Brett Robinson, a professor of soil and physical sciences at Lincoln University in New Zealand, warn that wind patterns in Southeast China disperse toxic particles released by open-air burning across the Pearl River Delta Region, home to 45 million people. In this way, toxic chemicals from e-waste enter the "soil-crop-food pathway," one of the most significant routes of human exposure to heavy metals. These chemicals are not biodegradable—they persist in the environment for long periods, increasing the risk of exposure.

In the agricultural district of Chachoengsao, in the east of Bangkok, local villagers had lost their main water source due to e-waste dumping. The cassava fields were transformed in late 2017, when a nearby Chinese-run factory began bringing in foreign e-waste, such as crushed computers, circuit boards, and cables, for recycling to extract valuable metals like copper, silver, and gold. But the items also contain lead, cadmium, and mercury, which are highly toxic if mishandled during processing. Apart from feeling faint from noxious fumes emitted during processing, a local claimed the factory has also contaminated her water. "When it was raining, the water went through the pile of waste and passed our house and went into the soil and water system. Water tests conducted in the province by environmental group Earth and the local government both found toxic levels of iron, manganese, lead, nickel, and, in some cases, arsenic and cadmium. The communities observed that when they used water from the shallow well, there was some development of skin disease, or there were foul smells", founder of Earth, Penchom Saetang, said: "This is proof that it is true, as the communities suspected, there are problems happening to their water sources."

The environmental impact of the processing of different electronic waste components
Component	Process used	Potential hazard
Cathode ray tubes (used in TVs, computer monitors, ATM, video cameras, and more).	Breaking and removal of yoke, then dumping.	Lead, barium, and other heavy metals leaching into the groundwater and release of toxic phosphor.
Printed circuit board (image behind table – a thin plate on which chips and other electronic components are placed).	De-soldering and removal of computer chips; open burning and acid baths to remove metals after chips are removed.	Air emissions and discharge into rivers of glass dust, tin, lead, brominated dioxin, beryllium, cadmium, and mercury.
Chips and other gold-plated components.	Chemical stripping using nitric and hydrochloric acid and burning of chips.	PAHs, heavy metals, brominated flame retardants discharged directly into rivers, acidifying fish and flora. Tin and lead contamination of surface and groundwater. Air emissions of brominated dioxins, heavy metals, and PAHs.
Plastics from printers, keyboards, monitors, etc.	Shredding and low temp melting to be reused.	Emissions of brominated dioxins, heavy metals, and hydrocarbons.
Computer wires.	Open burning and stripping to remove copper.	PAHs released into air, water, and soil.

Depending on the age and type of the discarded item, the chemical composition of e-waste may vary. Most e-waste consists of a mixture of metals, including Cu, Al, and Fe. They might be attached to, covered with, or even mixed with various types of plastics and ceramics. E-waste has a significant effect on the environment, and it is important to dispose of it with an R2 certified recycling facility.

== Recycling ==
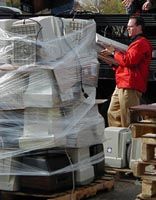
Computer monitors are typically packed into low stacks on wooden pallets for recycling and then shrink-wrapped.

Recycling can greatly reduce the leakage of toxic materials into the environment and mitigate against the depletion of natural resources. However, it needs to be encouraged by local authorities and through community education. Less than 20% of e-waste is formally recycled, with 80% either ending up in landfill or being informally recycled – much of it by hand in developing countries, exposing workers to hazardous and carcinogenic substances such as mercury, lead, and cadmium. Despite its high resource value, only a small fraction of global e-waste is formally recycled, making it very wasteful.

There are generally three methods of extracting precious metals from electronic waste, namely hydrometallurgical, pyrometallurgical, and hydro-pyrometallurgical methods. Each of these methods has its own advantages and disadvantages, as well as the potential to produce toxic waste.

One of the major challenges is recycling the printed circuit boards from electronic waste. The circuit boards contain such precious metals as gold, silver, platinum, etc., and such base metals as copper, iron, aluminum, etc. One way e-waste is processed is by melting circuit boards, burning cable sheathing to recover copper wire, and open-pit acid leaching to separate valuable metals. Conventional method employed is mechanical shredding and separation but the recycling efficiency is low. Alternative methods such as cryogenic decomposition have been studied for printed circuit board recycling, and some other methods are still under investigation. In 2023, an AF aerogel using protein fibrils in an aerogel matrix was developed for the adsorption of gold from circuit boards.

Properly disposing of or reusing electronics can help prevent health problems, reduce greenhouse-gas emissions, and create jobs.

=== Consumer awareness efforts ===
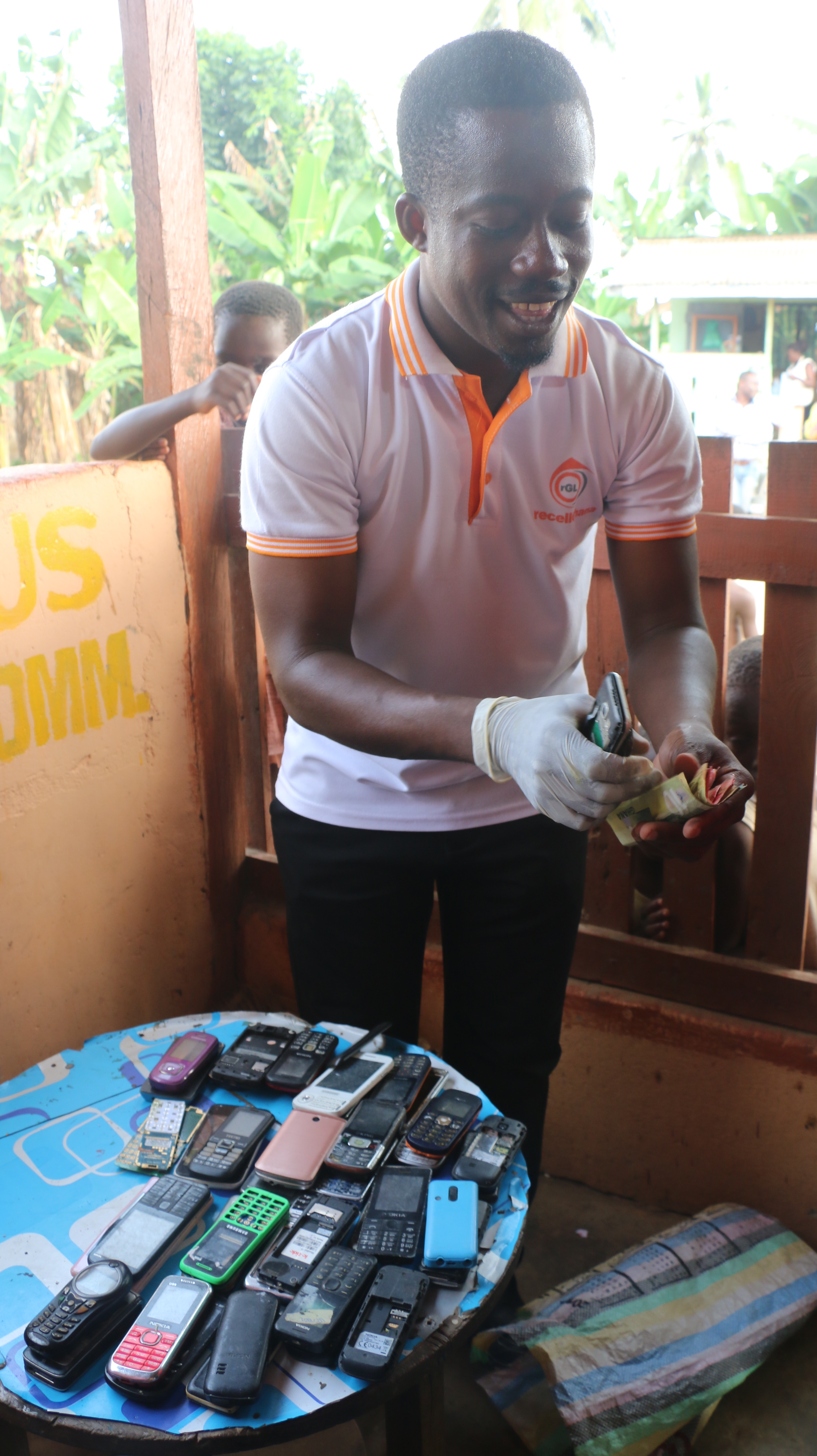
A campaign to promote E-waste recycling in Ghana.

The U.S. Environmental Protection Agency encourages electronic recyclers to become certified by demonstrating to an accredited, independent third-party auditor that they meet specific standards for safely recycling and managing electronics. This should work to ensure the highest environmental standards are maintained. Two certifications for electronic recyclers currently exist and are endorsed by the EPA. Customers are encouraged to choose certified electronics recyclers. Responsible electronics recycling reduces environmental and human health impacts, increases the use of reusable and refurbished equipment, and conserves limited resources while reducing energy use. The two EPA-endorsed certification programs are Responsible Recyclers Practices (R2) and E-Stewards. Certified companies ensure they meet strict environmental standards that maximize reuse and recycling, minimize exposure to human health and the environment, ensure the safe management of materials, and require the destruction of all data stored on electronics. Certified electronics recyclers have demonstrated through audits and other means that they continually meet specific high environmental standards and safely manage used electronics. Once certified, the recycler is held to the specific standard through continual oversight by the independent, accredited certifying body.

Some U.S. retailers offer consumers opportunities to recycle discarded electronic devices. In the US, the Consumer Electronics Association (CEA) urges consumers to dispose properly of end-of-life electronics through its recycling locator. This list includes only manufacturer and retailer programs that use the strictest standards and third-party-certified recycling locations, providing consumers with assurance that their products will be recycled safely and responsibly. CEA research has found that 58 percent of consumers know where to take their end-of-life electronics, and the electronics industry would very much like to see that level of awareness increase. Consumer electronics manufacturers and retailers sponsor or operate more than 5,000 recycling locations nationwide and have vowed to recycle one billion pounds annually by 2016, a sharp increase from 300 million pounds industry recycled in 2010.

The Sustainable Materials Management (SMM) Electronic Challenge was created by the United States Environmental Protection Agency (EPA) in 2012. Participants of the Challenge are manufacturers of electronics and electronic retailers. These companies collect end-of-life (EOL) electronics at various locations and send them to a certified, third-party recycler. Program participants can then publicly promote and report 100% responsible recycling for their companies. The Electronics TakeBack Coalition (ETBC) is a campaign aimed at protecting human health and limiting environmental effects where electronics are being produced, used, and discarded. The ETBC aims to place responsibility for the disposal of technology products on electronic manufacturers and brand owners, primarily through community promotions and legal enforcement initiatives. It provides recommendations for consumer recycling and a list of recyclers judged environmentally responsible. While there have been major benefits from the rise in recycling and waste collection created by producers and consumers, such as valuable materials being recovered and kept away from landfill and incineration, there are still many problems present with the EPR system including "how to ensure proper enforcement of recycling standards, what to do about waste with positive net value, and the role of competition" (Kunz et al.). Many stakeholders agreed that there needs to be a higher standard of accountability and efficiency to improve recycling systems everywhere, and that the growing amount of waste is more of an opportunity than a problem, since it gives us more opportunities to create efficient systems. To make recycling competition more cost-effective, the producers agreed that there needs to be a higher drive for competition because it allows them to have a wider range of producer responsibility organizations to choose from for e-waste recycling.

The Certified Electronics Recycler program for electronic recyclers is a comprehensive, integrated management system standard that incorporates key operational and continual improvement elements for quality, environmental, and health and safety performance. The grassroots Silicon Valley Toxics Coalition promotes human health and addresses environmental justice issues arising from toxins in technology. The World Reuse, Repair, and Recycling Association (wr3a.org) is an organization dedicated to improving the quality of exported electronics, encouraging better recycling standards in importing countries, and improving practices through "Fair Trade" principles. Take Back My TV (possibly discontinued) is a project of The Electronics TakeBack Coalition and grades television manufacturers to find out which are responsible, in the coalition's view, and which are not.

There have also been efforts to raise awareness of the potentially hazardous conditions of the dismantling of e-waste in American prisons. The Silicon Valley Toxics Coalition, prisoner-rights activists, and environmental groups released a Toxic Sweatshops report that details how prison labor is being used to handle e-waste, resulting in health consequences among the workers. These groups allege that, since prisons do not have adequate safety standards, inmates are dismantling the products under unhealthy and unsafe conditions.

A group in Argentina known as Argentina's Cyber Dumpster Divers specializes in collecting e-waste from the streets and repurposing it for good. This group takes e-waste and turns it into new things, such as cameras and video game consoles. This activism came especially critical during the Covid pandemic.

=== Processing techniques ===
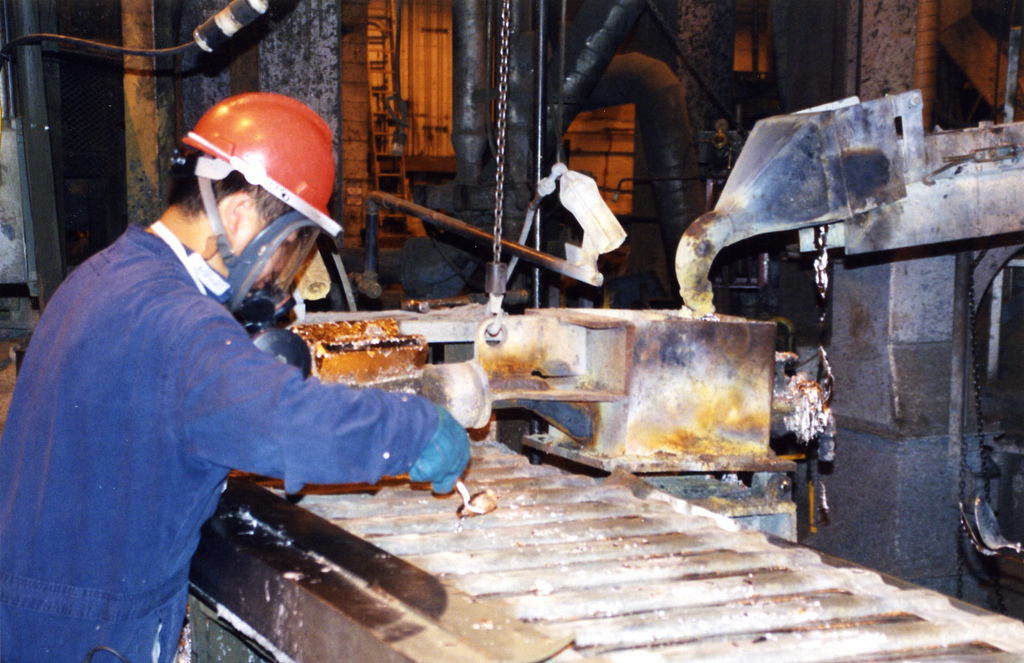
Recycling lead from batteries.

In many developed countries, electronic waste processing usually begins with dismantling the equipment into various parts (metal frames, power supplies, circuit boards, plastics), often by hand but increasingly by automated shredding equipment. A typical example is the NADIN electronic waste processing plant in Novi Iskar, Bulgaria—the largest facility of its kind in Eastern Europe. The advantages of this process are the human worker's ability to recognize and save working and repairable parts, including chips, transistors, RAM, etc. The disadvantage is that the labor is cheapest in countries with the lowest health and safety standards.

In an alternative bulk system, a hopper conveys material for shredding into an unsophisticated mechanical separator, with screening and granulating machines to separate constituent metal and plastic fractions, which are sold to smelters or plastics recyclers. Such recycling machinery is enclosed and employs a dust collection system. Scrubbers and screens catch some of the emissions. Magnets, eddy currents, and Trommel screens are employed to separate glass, plastic, and ferrous and nonferrous metals, which can then be further separated at a smelter.

Copper, gold, palladium, silver, and tin are valuable metals sold to smelters for recycling. Hazardous smoke and gases are captured, contained, and treated to mitigate environmental threats. These methods allow for safe reclamation of all valuable computer construction materials. Hewlett-Packard product recycling solutions manager Renee St. Denis describes its process as: "We move them through giant shredders about 30 feet tall and it shreds everything into pieces about the size of a quarter. Once your disk drive is shredded into pieces about this big, it's hard to get the data off". An ideal electronic waste recycling plant combines dismantling for component recovery with increased cost-effective processing of bulk electronic waste. Reuse is an alternative to recycling because it extends a device's lifespan. Devices still need to be recycled eventually, but by allowing others to purchase used electronics, recycling can be postponed, and value can be gained from device use.

In early November 2021, the U.S. state of Georgia announced a joint effort with Igneo Technologies to build an $85 million large electronics recycling plant in the Port of Savannah. The project will focus on lower-value, plastics-heavy devices in the waste stream using multiple shredders and furnaces using pyrolysis technology.

=== Benefits of recycling ===
Recycling raw materials from end-of-life electronics is the most effective solution to the growing e-waste problem. Most electronic devices contain a variety of materials, including metals that can be recovered for future uses. By dismantling and enabling reuse, intact natural resources are conserved, and air and water pollution from hazardous disposal is avoided. Additionally, recycling reduces greenhouse gas emissions from manufacturing new products. Another benefit of recycling e-waste is that many of the materials can be recycled and reused. Materials that can be recycled include "ferrous (iron-based) and non-ferrous metals, glass, and various types of plastic." "Non-ferrous metals, mainly aluminum and copper can all be re-smelted and re-manufactured. Ferrous metals such as steel and iron also can be re-used." Due to the recent surge in popularity in 3D printing, certain 3D printers have been designed (FDM variety) to produce waste that can be easily recycled, which decreases the amount of harmful pollutants in the atmosphere. The excess plastic from these printers that comes out as a byproduct can also be reused to create new 3D printed creations.

The benefits of recycling are extended when responsible recycling methods are used. In the U.S., responsible recycling aims to minimize the risks to human health and the environment posed by disposed and dismantled electronics. Responsible recycling ensures best management practices for the electronics being recycled, worker health and safety, and consideration of the environment locally and abroad. In Europe, metals that are recycled are returned to companies of origin at a reduced cost. Through a committed recycling system, manufacturers in Japan have been pushed to make their products more sustainable. Since many companies were responsible for recycling their own products, this imposed a new responsibility on manufacturers, requiring many to redesign their infrastructure. As a result, manufacturers in Japan have the added option to sell the recycled metals.

Improper management of e-waste is resulting in a significant loss of scarce and valuable raw materials, such as gold, platinum, cobalt, and rare earth elements. As much as 7% of the world's gold may currently be contained in e-waste, with 100 times more gold in a tonne of e-waste than in a tonne of gold ore.

== Repair as waste reduction method ==
There are several ways to curb the environmental hazards arising from the recycling of electronic waste. One of the factors that exacerbates the e-waste problem is the diminishing lifetime of many electrical and electronic goods. There are two drivers (in particular) for this trend. On the one hand, consumer demand for low-cost products undermines product quality and leads to short product lifetimes. On the other, manufacturers in some sectors encourage a regular upgrade cycle, and may even enforce it though restricted availability of spare parts, service manuals and software updates, or through planned obsolescence.

Consumer dissatisfaction with this state of affairs has led to a growing repair movement. Often, this is at a community level, such as through repair cafés or the "restart parties" promoted by the Restart Project.

Discarded data-processing equipment may still contain readable data that could be considered sensitive to its previous users. Also, deleting the data and performing a factory reset might not completely erase it. Thus, this data may be recovered by unethical or malicious actors, sometimes even resulting in a data breach. A recycling plan for such equipment can support information security by ensuring proper steps are followed to erase the sensitive information.

The right to repair movement in the US is spearheaded by farmers dissatisfied with the lack of service information, specialized tools, and spare parts for their high-tech farm machinery. But the movement extends far beyond farm machinery, with, for example, Apple's restricted repair options coming in for criticism. Manufacturers often counter with safety concerns resulting from unauthorized repairs and modifications.

An easy way to reduce the electronic waste footprint is to sell or donate electronic devices rather than dispose of them. Improperly disposed e-waste is becoming increasingly hazardous, especially as its sheer volume increases. For this reason, large brands like Apple, Samsung, and others have started offering customers options to recycle old electronics. Recycling allows the expensive electronic parts inside to be reused. This may save significant energy and reduce the need to mine additional raw materials or manufacture new components. Electronic recycling programs may be found locally with a simple online search; for example, by searching "recycle electronics" along with the city or area name.

Cloud services have proven useful for storing data, which is then accessible from anywhere in the world without the need to carry storage devices. Cloud storage also allows for large storage at a low cost. This offers convenience, while reducing the need for manufacture of new storage devices, thus curbing the amount of e-waste generated.

== Electronic waste substances ==
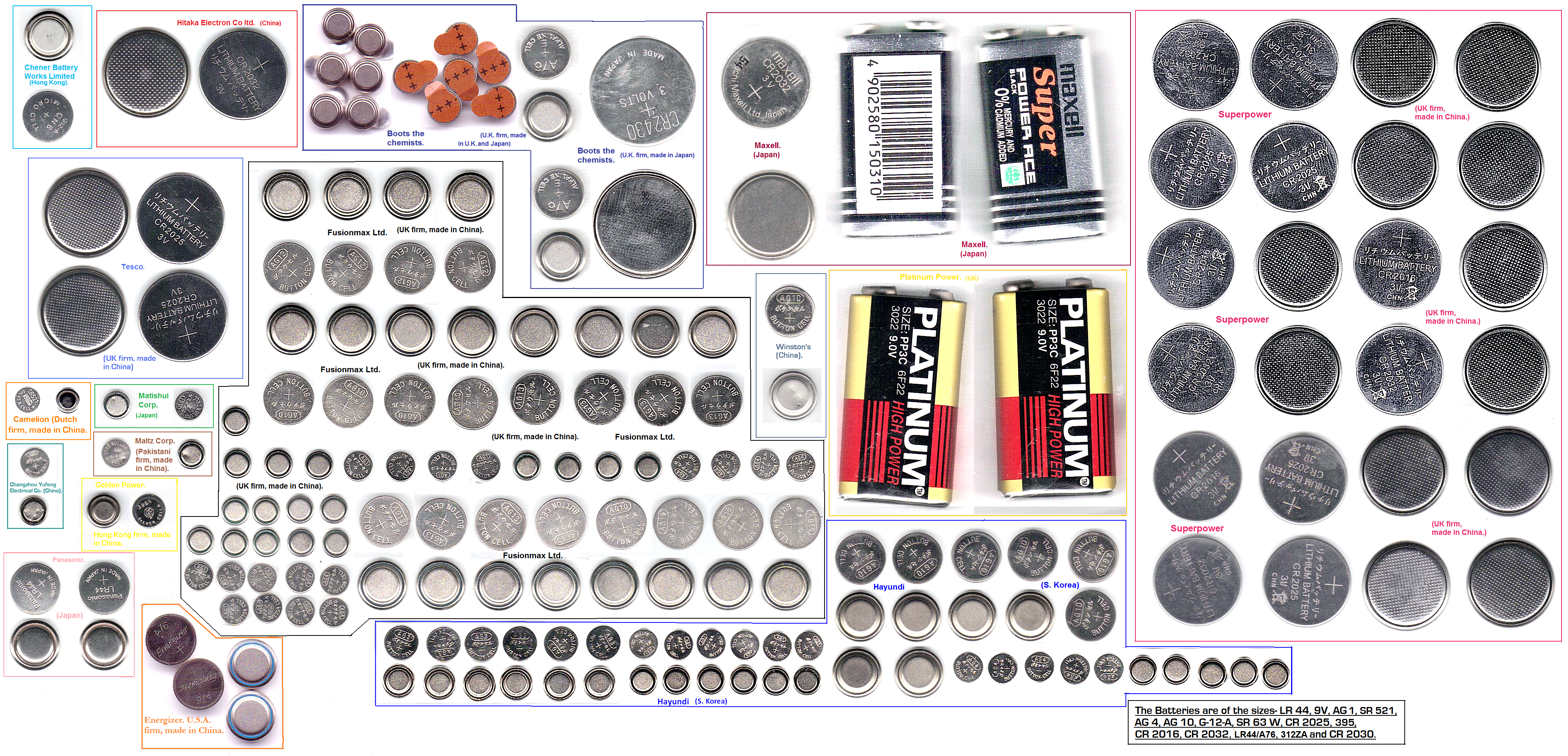
Several sizes of button and coin cell with 2 9v batteries as a size comparison. They are all recycled in many countries since they often contain lead, mercury, and cadmium.

Some computer components can be reused in assembling new computer products, while others are reduced to metals that can be reused in applications as varied as construction, flatware, and jewelry. Substances found in large quantities include epoxy resins, fiberglass, PCBs, PVC (polyvinyl chlorides), thermosetting plastics, lead, tin, copper, silicon, beryllium, carbon, iron, and aluminum. Elements found in small amounts include cadmium, mercury, and thallium. Elements found in trace amounts include americium, antimony, arsenic, barium, bismuth, boron, cobalt, europium, gallium, germanium, gold, indium, lithium, manganese, nickel, niobium, palladium, platinum, rhodium, ruthenium, selenium, silver, tantalum, terbium, thorium, titanium, vanadium, and yttrium. The following are ordinary applications:

=== Hazardous ===
Hazardous waste material from e-waste
E-waste component	Electric appliances in which they are found	Adverse health effects
Americium	The radioactive source in smoke alarms.	Carcinogenic
Lead	Solder, CRT monitor glass, lead–acid batteries, some formulations of PVC. A typical 15-inch cathode ray tube may contain 1.5 pounds of lead, but other CRTs have been estimated as having up to 8 pounds of lead.	Impaired cognitive function, behavioral disturbances, attention deficits, hyperactivity, conduct problems, and lower IQ. These effects are exasperated in children given their developing nervous system.
Mercury	Found in fluorescent tubes (numerous applications), tilt switches (mechanical doorbells, thermostats), and ccfl backlights in flat screen monitors.	Sensory impairment, dermatitis, memory loss, and muscle weakness. In utero exposure causes fetal deficits in motor, attention, and verbal domains. Environmental effects in animals include death, reduced fertility, and slower growth and development.
Cadmium	Found in light-sensitive resistors, corrosion-resistant alloys for marine and aviation environments, and nickel–cadmium batteries. The most common form of cadmium is found in nickel–cadmium rechargeable batteries. These batteries tend to contain between 6 and 18% cadmium. The sale of nickel–cadmium portable batteries has been banned in the EU. When not properly recycled, it can leach into the soil, harming microorganisms and disrupting the soil ecosystem. Exposure is caused by proximity to hazardous waste sites and factories, as well as to workers in the metal refining industry.	Inhalation of cadmium can cause severe damage to the lungs and kidneys. It is also associated with deficits in cognition, learning, behavior, and neuromotor skills in children.
Hexavalent chromium	Used in metal coatings to protect from corrosion.	A known carcinogen after occupational inhalation exposure. There is also evidence of cytotoxic and genotoxic effects of some chemicals, which have been shown to inhibit cell proliferation, induce cell membrane lesions, cause single-strand DNA breaks, and elevate Reactive Oxygen Species (ROS) levels.
Sulfur	Found in lead–acid batteries.	Health effects include liver damage, kidney damage, heart damage, eye and throat irritation. When released into the environment, it can create sulfuric acid through sulfur dioxide.
Brominated Flame Retardants (BFRs)	Used as flame retardants in plastics in most electronics. Includes PBBs, PBDE, DecaBDE, OctaBDE, PentaBDE.	Health effects include impaired development of the nervous system, thyroid problems, and liver problems. Environmental effects: similar effects as in animals as humans. PBBs were banned from 1973 to 1977. PCBs were banned during the 1980s.
Perfluorooctanoic acid (PFOA)	Used as an antistatic additive in industrial applications and found in electronics, also found in non-stick cookware (PTFE). PFOAs are formed synthetically through environmental degradation.	Studies in mice have found the following health effects: Hepatotoxicity, developmental toxicity, immunotoxicity, hormonal effects, and carcinogenic effects. Studies have found increased maternal PFOA levels to be associated with an increased risk of spontaneous abortion (miscarriage) and stillbirth. Increased maternal PFOA levels are also associated with decreases in mean gestational age (preterm birth), mean birth weight (low birth weight), mean birth length (small for gestational age), and mean APGAR score.
Beryllium oxide	Filler in some thermal interface materials such as thermal grease used on heatsinks for CPUs and power transistors, magnetrons, X-ray-transparent ceramic windows, heat transfer fins in vacuum tubes, and gas lasers.	Occupational exposures associated with lung cancer, other common adverse health effects are beryllium sensitization, chronic beryllium disease, and acute beryllium disease.
Polyvinyl chloride (PVC)	Commonly found in electronics and is typically used as insulation for electrical cables.	In the manufacturing phase, toxic and hazardous raw materials, including dioxins, are released. PVC, such as chlorine, tends to bioaccumulate. Over time, the compounds that contain chlorine can become pollutants in the air, water, and soil. This poses a problem as humans and animals can ingest them. Additionally, exposure to toxins can result in reproductive and developmental health effects.

=== Generally non-hazardous ===
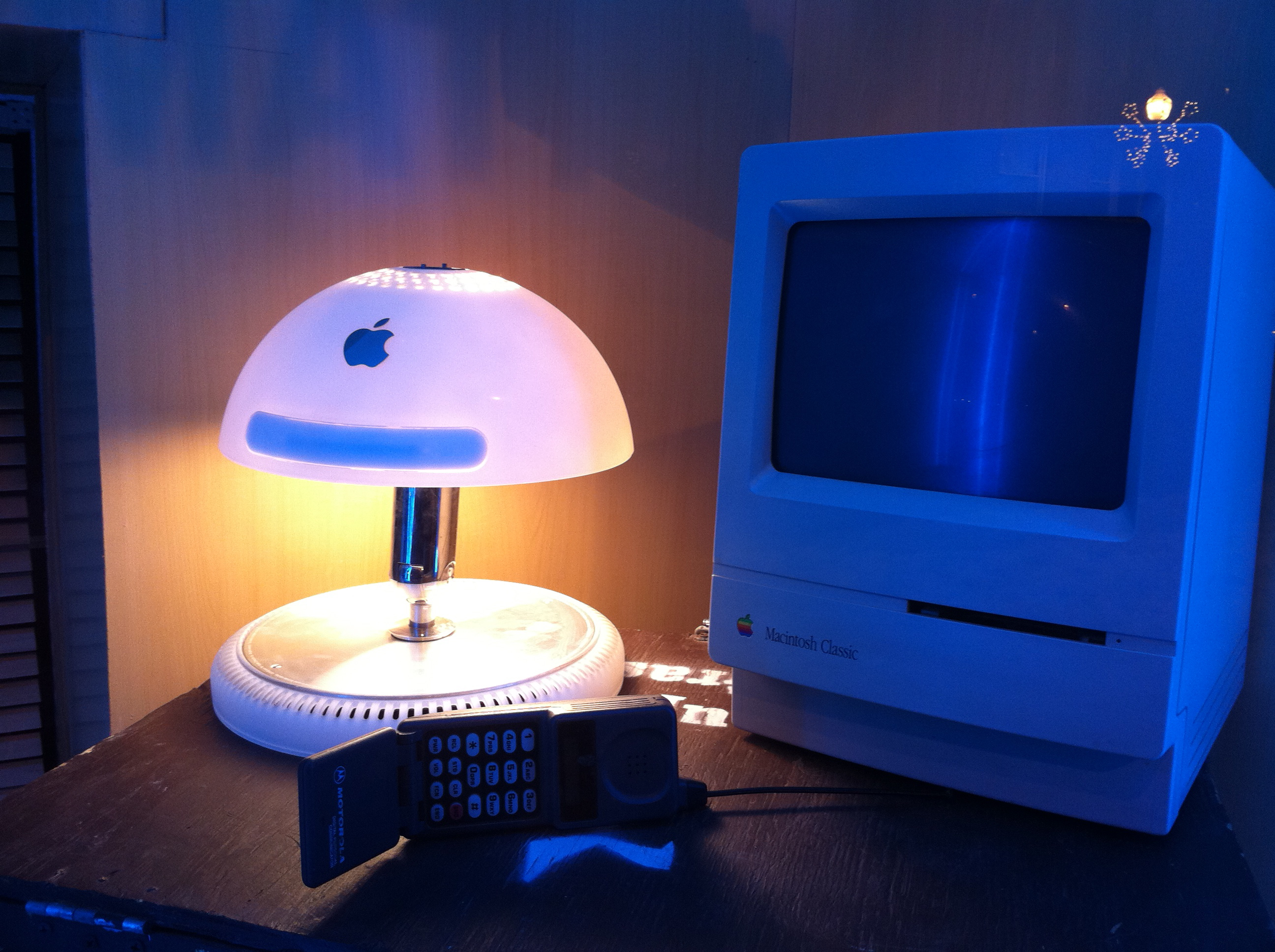
An iMac G4 that has been repurposed into a lamp (photographed next to a Macintosh Classic and a Motorola MicroTAC).

Recycling non-hazardous waste
E-waste component	Process used
Aluminum	Nearly all electronic goods using more than a few watts of power (heatsinks), ICs, electrolytic capacitors
Copper	Copper wire, printed circuit board tracks, ICs, component leads
Germanium	1950s–1960s transistorized electronics (bipolar junction transistors)
Gold	Connector plating, primarily in computer equipment
Lithium	Lithium-ion batteries
Nickel	Nickel–cadmium batteries
Silicon	Glass, transistors, ICs, printed circuit boards
Tin	Solder, coatings on component leads
Zinc	Plating for steel parts

== Human health and safety ==
=== Residents living near recycling sites ===
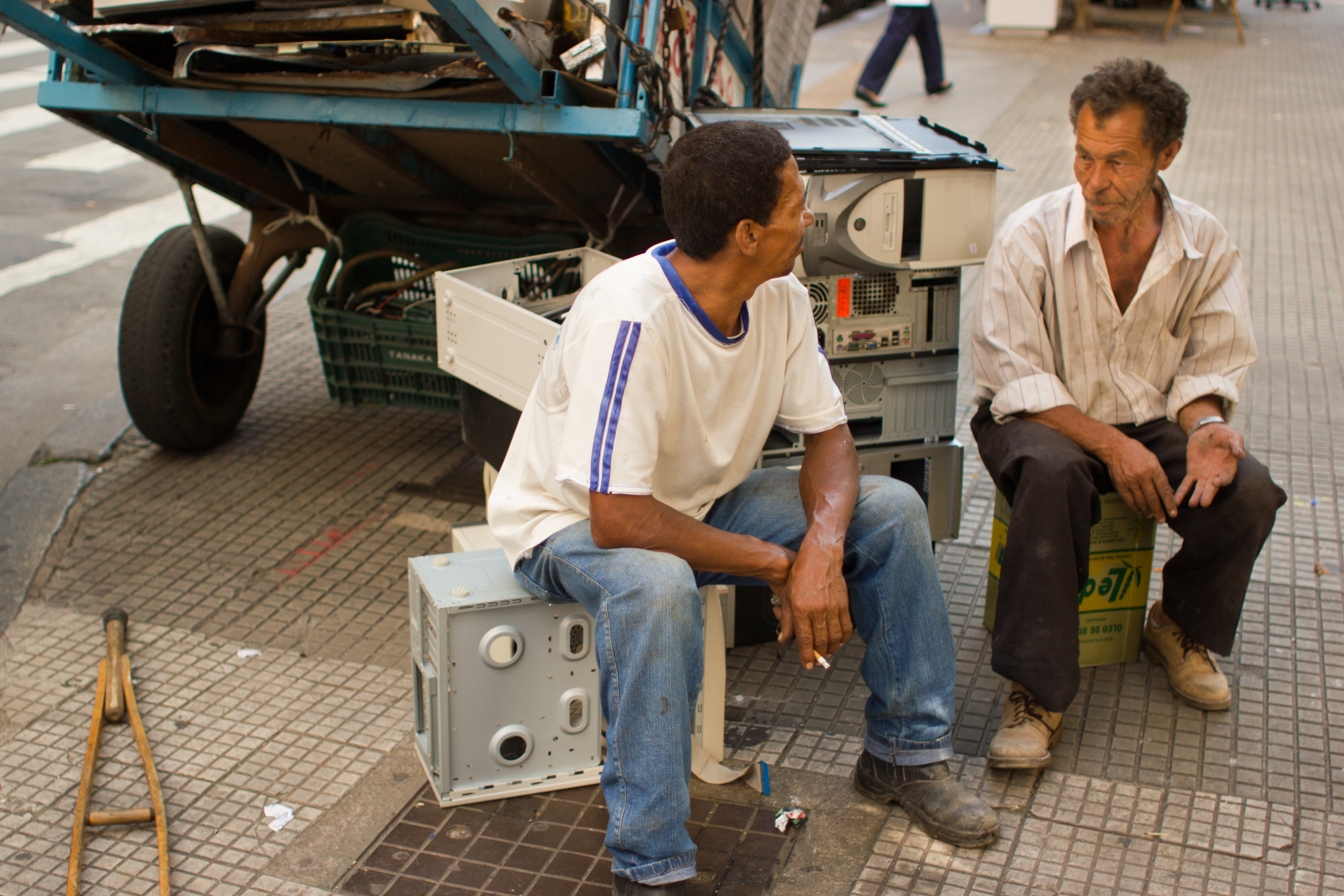
Recyclers in the street in São Paulo, Brazil, with old computers.

Residents living around e-waste recycling sites, even if they are not involved in e-waste recycling activities, can also face environmental exposure due to the contamination of food, water, and the environment. In general, there are three main exposure pathways: inhalation, ingestion, and dermal contact.

Studies show that people living near e-waste recycling sites have higher daily intake of heavy metals and a greater body burden of these metals, and an increased vulnerability in children and pregnant women. The potential health risks include mental health damage, impaired cognitive function, and general physical health damage. DNA damage was also found to be more prevalent in e-waste-exposed populations than in comparable populations in an area without e-waste exposure. DNA breaks can increase the likelihood of wrong replication and thus mutation, as well as lead to cancer if the damage is to a tumor suppressor gene. Studies show workers involved in e-waste recycling are particularly at risk, as they are directly exposed to hazardous substances through dismantling, burning, and acid-leaching processes, leading to measurable levels of toxic chemicals in their bodies.

==== Prenatal exposure and neonates' health ====
Prenatal exposure to e-waste has been found to increase the human body burden of pollutants in neonates. In Guiyu, one of the most famous e-waste recycling sites in China, higher cord blood lead concentrations in newborns were associated with parents' participation in e-waste recycling and with the length of time mothers spent living in Guiyu and working in e-waste recycling factories or workshops during pregnancy. Besides, a higher placental metallothionein (a small protein marking the exposure of toxic metals) was found among neonates from Guiyu as a result of Cd exposure, while the higher Cd level in Guiyu's neonates was related to the involvement in e-waste recycling of their parents. High PFOA exposure of mothers in Guiyu is related to adverse effect on growth of their new-born and the prepotency in this area.

Prenatal exposure to informal e-waste recycling can also lead to several adverse birth outcomes (stillbirth, low birth weight, low Apgar scores, etc.) and long-term effects such as behavioral and learning problems of the neonates in their future life.

==== Children ====
Children are especially sensitive to e-waste exposure because of their smaller size, higher metabolism rate, larger surface area in relation to their weight, and multiple exposure pathways (for example, dermal, hand-to-mouth, and take-home exposure). They were measured to have an 8-times potential health risk compared to the adult e-waste recycling workers. Studies have found significantly higher blood lead levels (BLL) and blood cadmium levels (BCL) in children living in e-waste recycling areas compared to those living in control areas. For example, one study found that the average BLL in Guiyu was nearly 1.5 times compared to that in the control site (15.3 μg/dL compared to 9.9 μg/dL), while the CDC of the United States has set a reference level for blood lead at 5 μg/dL. The highest concentrations of lead were found in the children of parents whose workshop dealt with circuit boards, and the lowest was among those who recycled plastic.

Exposure to e-waste can cause serious health problems to children. Children's exposure to developmental neurotoxins in e-waste such as lead, mercury, cadmium, chromium, arsenic, nickel and PBDEs can lead to impaired cognitive function and other adverse effects. Some studies also found associations between children's e-waste exposure and decreased lung function, impaired coagulation, hearing loss, and decreased vaccine antibody tilters.

=== E-waste recycling workers ===
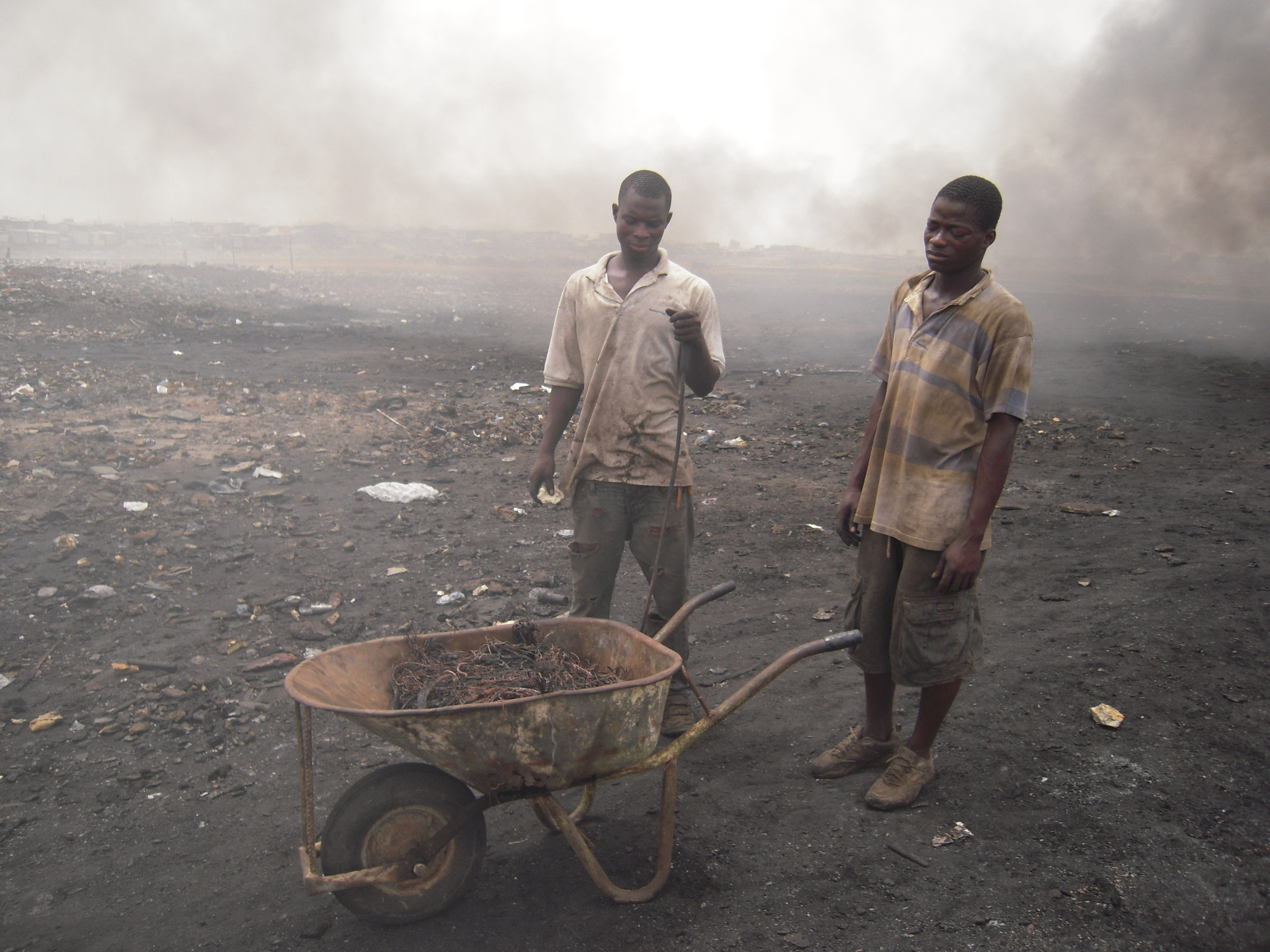
Agbogbloshie e-waste workers completing a burn for copper recovery, 2010.

The Occupational Safety & Health Administration (OSHA) has summarized several potential safety hazards of recycling workers in general, such as crushing and cutting hazards, dangerous levels of noise, hazardous energy released, and exposure to toxic metals and dusts.

OSHA has also specified some chemical components of electronics that can potentially harm e-recycling workers' health, such as lead, mercury, PCBs, asbestos, refractory ceramic fibers (RCFs), and radioactive substances. Besides, in the United States, most of these chemical hazards have specific Occupational exposure limits (OELs) set by OSHA, National Institute for Occupational Safety and Health (NIOSH), and American Conference of Governmental Industrial Hygienists (ACGIH). For the details of health consequences of these chemical hazards, see also Electronic waste#Electronic waste substances.

A 2024 systematic review of 26 studies on informal e-waste recycling workers reported associations with respiratory symptoms, kidney dysfunction, and hormonal changes, as well as frequent injuries and skin conditions. However, the authors found that the evidence was generally insufficient to establish causal relationships for most health outcomes, with stronger evidence for injuries and skin conditions.

==== Informal and formal industries ====
The informal e-recycling industry refers to small e-waste recycling workshops with few (if any) automated procedures and workers equipped with personal protective equipment (PPE). On the other hand, the formal e-recycling industry comprises regular e-recycling facilities that sort e-waste materials using automated machinery and manual labor, with pollution control and PPE common. Sometimes formal e-recycling facilities dismantle the e-waste to sort materials, then distribute it to other downstream recycling departments to further recover materials such as plastic and metals.

The health impacts of e-waste recycling workers in the informal and formal sectors are expected to differ in extent. Studies in three recycling sites in China suggest that the health risks of workers from formal e-recycling facilities in Jiangsu and Shanghai were lower compared to those who worked in informal e-recycling sites in Guiyu. The primitive methods used by unregulated backyard operators (e.g., the informal sector) to reclaim, reprocess, and recycle e-waste materials expose the workers to many toxic substances. Processes such as dismantling components, wet chemical processing, and incineration are used and result in direct exposure and inhalation of harmful chemicals. Burning is common in informal recycling practices to recover metals from electronic waste.

Such informal recycling can occur at landfill sites, where waste is distributed, or in separate areas overseen by families. Children often perform recycling duties in these families, in which case e-waste pollution has greater impacts on their developing health. Safety equipment such as gloves, face masks, and ventilation fans is virtually unknown, and workers often have little idea of what they are handling.

In another study of e-waste recycling in India, hair samples were collected from workers at an e-waste recycling facility and an e-waste recycling slum community (informal industry) in Bangalore. Levels of V, Cr, Mn, Mo, Sn, Ti, and Pb were significantly higher in the workers at the e-waste recycling facility compared to the e-waste workers in the slum community. However, Co, Ag, Cd, and Hg levels were significantly higher among slum community workers than among facility workers.

Even in the formal e-recycling industry, workers can be exposed to excessive pollutants. Studies of formal e-recycling facilities in France and Sweden found workers' overexposure (compared to recommended occupational guidelines) to lead, cadmium, mercury, and other metals, as well as BFRs, PCBs, dioxins, and furans. Workers in the formal industry are also exposed to higher levels of brominated flame retardants than the reference groups.

Much e-waste informal recycling occurs in low-income or developing countries and communities. For instance, a 2025 e-waste report from Transparency International Bangladesh (TIP) included a 2017 study by the Department of Environment, which found that 97 percent of e-waste was collected informally in the country. Informal collection and recycling in these regions are often undocumented and unregulated. This can greatly affect the health and safety of workers exposed to informal recycling and collection, since legislation may not record or address their working conditions.

== Legislative frameworks ==
The European Union (EU) has addressed the issue of electronic Waste by introducing two pieces of legislation. The first, the Waste Electrical and Electronic Equipment Directive (WEEE Directive) came into force in 2003. The main aim of this directive was to regulate and motivate electronic waste recycling and re-use in member states at that moment. It was revised in 2008, and the updated version came into force in 2014. Furthermore, the EU has also implemented the Directive on the restriction of the use of certain hazardous substances in electrical and electronic equipment from 2003. This document was additionally revised in 2012. When it comes to Western Balkan countries, North Macedonia adopted a Law on Batteries and Accumulators in 2010, followed by the Law on Management of electrical and electronic equipment in 2012. Serbia has regulated management of special waste stream, including electronic waste, by the National Waste Management Strategy (2010–2019).

Montenegro has adopted Concessionary Act concerning electronic waste with ambition to collect 4 kg of this waste annually per person until 2020. The Albanian legal framework is based on the draft act on waste from electrical and electronic equipment from 2011, which focuses on the design of electrical and electronic equipment. By contrast, Bosnia and Herzegovina still lacks a law regulating electronic waste. In Asia, countries such as Thailand and China have been fighting against e-waste imports. Thailand instituted a complete ban on e-waste imports in 2020, while China also did so in 2018. While these measures have had some success, loopholes have been exploited to circumvent these policies.

As of 2024, 81 countries globally have established either a policy, legislation, or specific regulation to govern e-waste. However, there is no clear indication that countries are following the regulations. Regions such as Asia and Africa have policies that are not legally binding and rather have only programmatic ones. Hence, this poses a challenge that e-waste management policies are yet not fully developed by some countries. For example, EU research has shown that legislation against e-waste has led to increased e-waste exports.

=== Solving the e-waste Problem (StEP) initiative ===
Solving the E-waste Problem is a membership organization part of the United Nations University that was created to develop solutions to address issues associated with electronic waste. Some of the most eminent players in the fields of Production, Reuse and Recycling of Electrical and Electronic Equipment (EEE), government agencies and NGOs, as well as UN Organisations count themselves among its members. StEP encourages collaboration among all stakeholders involved in e-waste, emphasizing a holistic, scientific yet practical approach to the problem.

=== Waste electrical and electronic equipment ===
The European Commission (EC) of the EU has classified "waste electrical and electronic equipment" (WEEE) as waste generated by electrical devices and household appliances, such as refrigerators, televisions, and mobile phones, as well as other devices.

==== WEEE Directive ====
The WEEE Directive was implemented in February 2003, focusing on recycling electronic waste. This Directive offered many electronic waste collection schemes free of charge to the consumers.

The EC revised this Directive in December 2008. In August 2012, the WEEE Directive was rolled out to handle the situation of controlling electronic waste and this was implemented on 14 February 2014. On 18 April 2017, the EC adopted a common principle for conducting research and a new regulation to monitor the amount of WEEE, requiring each member state to monitor and report its national market data.

==== RoHS Directive ====
In 2003, the EC not only implemented legislation on waste collection but also the RoHS Directive on the alternative use of hazardous materials (Cadmium, mercury, flammable materials, polybrominated biphenyls, lead and polybrominated diphenyl ethers) used in the production of electronic and electric equipment.

This Directive was again revised in December 2008 and later again in January 2013. In 2017, the EC has made adjustment to the existing Directive considering the impact assessment and adopted to a new legislative proposal. On 21 November 2017, the European Parliament and Council published this legislation amending the RoHS 2 Directive in their official journal.

=== European Commission legislation on batteries and accumulators (Batteries Directive) ===
Each year, the EU reports that nearly 800,000 tons of automotive batteries, around 190,000 tons of industrial batteries, and around 160,000 tons of consumer batteries enter the European region. The EC rolled out a Directive to control the waste from batteries and accumulators, known as the 'Batteries Directive'. This Directive also supervises and administers the internal market by implementing required measures.

This Directive restricts the production and marketing of batteries and accumulators that contain hazardous materials, are harmful to the environment, and are difficult to collect and recycle. Batteries Directive targets the collection, recycling, and other recycling activities of batteries and accumulators, also approving labels for the batteries which are environmentally neutral. On 10 December 2020, the EC proposed a new regulation (Batteries Regulation) on battery waste, which aims to make sure that batteries entering the European market are recyclable, sustainable, and non-hazardous.

==== Legislation ====
In 2006, the EC adopted the Batteries Directive, which it revised in 2013.

On 6 September 2006, the European Parliament and European Council launched Directives on waste from Batteries and accumulators.

==== Overview of Batteries and accumulators Legislation ====
Revising Directives could be based on the Evaluation process, given the increasing use of batteries in multiple communication technologies, household appliances, and other small battery-powered products. The increase in demand for renewable energy and product recycling has also led to the launch of the 'European Batteries Alliance (EBA)', which aims to oversee the entire value chain for the production of improved batteries and accumulators within Europe under this new policy act. Though the adoption of the Evaluation process has been broadly accepted, a few concerns have arisen, particularly regarding the management and monitoring of hazardous materials in battery production, the collection of battery waste, and the recycling of battery waste under the Directives. The evaluation process has definitely yielded good results in areas such as controlling environmental damage, increasing awareness of recycling and reusable batteries, and improving the efficiency of internal markets.

However, there are a few limitations in implementing the Batteries Directive in the collection of battery waste and the recovery of usable materials from it. The evaluation process sheds light on gaps in implementation and in collaborative technical aspects, as well as on new ways of use that complicate implementation, and this Directive maintains balance with technological advancements. The EC's regulations and guidelines have made the evaluation process more effective. The participation of several stakeholders in the evaluation process, who are invited to provide their views and ideas to improve the evaluation and information-gathering processes. On 14 March 2018, stakeholders and members of the association participated to share their findings and support, and to advance the Evaluation Roadmap.

=== European Union directives on e-waste ===
The European Union (EU) has addressed the e-waste issue by adopting several directives. In 2011, an amendment was made to Directive 2002/95/EC regarding the restriction of the use of hazardous materials in the planning and manufacturing processes for EEE. Directive 2011/65/EU states that the motivation for more specific restrictions on the use of hazardous materials in the planning and manufacturing processes of electronic and electrical devices was the disparity among EU Member States' laws. The need arose to set forth rules to protect human health and for the environmentally sound recovery and disposal of WEEE. (2011/65/EU, (2)) The Directive lists several substances subject to restriction. The Directive states restricted substances for maximum concentration values tolerated by weight in homogeneous materials are the following: lead (0.1%); mercury (0.1%), cadmium (0.1%), hexavalent chromium (0.1%), polybrominated biphenyls (PBB) (0.1%), and polybrominated diphenyl ethers (PBDE) (0.1%). If technologically feasible and a substitution is available, its use is required.

There are, however, exemptions in cases in which substitution is not possible from the scientific and technical point of view. The allowance and duration of the substitutions should take into account the availability of the substitute and the socioeconomic impact of the substitute. (2011/65/EU, (18))

EU Directive 2012/19/EU regulates WEEE and sets out measures to safeguard the environment and human health by mitigating the impacts of WEEE generation and management. (2012/19/EU, (1)) The Directive takes a specific approach to the product design of EEE. It states in Article 4 that Member States are required to expedite the development of models and manufacturing processes, as well as cooperation between producers and recyclers, to facilitate the re-use, dismantling, and recovery of WEEE, its components, and materials. (2012/19/EU, (4)) The Member States should implement measures to ensure that producers of EEE use eco-design, meaning that manufacturing processes are selected that do not restrict the later reuse of WEEE. The Directive also imposes an obligation on Member States to ensure the separate collection and transport of different types of WEEE. Article 8 lays out the requirements of the proper treatment of WEEE. The minimum proper treatment required for every WEEE is the removal of all liquids.

In 2021, the European Commission proposed implementing a standardization for iterations of USB-C in phone charger products, following the commissioning of two impact assessment studies and a technology analysis study. Regulations like this may reduce electronic waste by small but significant amounts and, in this case, increase device interoperability, convergence, and consumer convenience while decreasing resource needs and redundancy. The regulations were passed in June 2022, mandating that all phones sold in the EU to have USB-C charging ports by late 2024.

=== International agreements ===
A report by the United Nations Environment Management Group lists key processes and agreements made by various organizations globally in an effort to manage and control e-waste. Details about the policies can be found at the links below.

- International Convention for the Prevention of Pollution from Ships (MARPOL) (73/78/97)
- Basel Convention on the Control of Transboundary Movements of Hazardous Wastes and their Disposal (1989)
- Montreal Protocol on Ozone Depleting Substances (1989)
- International Labour Organization (ILO) Convention on Chemicals, concerning safety in the use of chemicals at work (1990)
- Organisation for Economic Cooperation and Development (OECD), Council Decision Waste Agreement (1992)
- United Nations Framework Convention on Climate Change (UNFCCC) (1994)
- International Conference on Chemicals Management (ICCM) (1995)
- Rotterdam Convention on the Prior Informed Consent Procedure for Certain Hazardous Chemicals and Pesticides in International Trade (1998)
- Stockholm Convention on Persistent Organic Pollutants (2001)
- World Health Organisation (WHO), World Health Assembly Resolutions (2006–2016)
- Hong Kong International Convention for the Safe and Environmentally Sound Recycling of Ships (2009)
- Minamata Convention on Mercury (2013)
- Paris Climate Agreement (2015) under the United Nations Framework Convention on Climate Change
- Connect 2020 Agenda for Global Telecommunication/ICT Development (2014)

== See also ==
- Urban mining
- Green computing
- Electronic waste in Japan

=== Policy and conventions ===
- China RoHS
- Restriction of Hazardous Substances Directive (RoHS)
- Soesterberg Principles
- Sustainable Electronics Initiative (SEI)

=== Organizations ===
- Asset Disposal and Information Security Alliance (ADISA)
- International Network for Environmental Compliance and Enforcement

=== Security ===
- Data erasure
