= ADISA certification =

ADISA Certification Limited (formerly Asset Disposal and Information Security Alliance) is a certification body specialising in data protection and quality management and is the operator of two UK GDPR Certification Schemes. These are officially approved by the UK Information Commissioner’s office and the audit process is accredited by the United Kingdom Accreditation Service. The two schemes are ADISA ICT Asset Recovery Standard 8.0 and Legal Services Operational Privacy Certification Scheme (LOCS:23) for the legal sector.

The ADISA testing laboratory called the ADISA Research Centre is the leading test lab for data sanitisation and is currently the only lab verifying compliance to data sanitisation standards NIST 800-88 and IEEE 2883.

== History ==
Founded in 2010, ADISA has developed several standards and certification schemes to ensure secure IT asset disposal and data sanitisation. In 2019, ADISA launched the ADISA Research Centre (ARC). ARC delivers product certification schemes for software and hardware data sanitisation tools. The ADISA Product Claims and Product Assurance Schemes are different levels of product testing for data sanitisation tools.

In July 2021, the ADISA ICT Asset Recovery Standard 8.0 was formally approved by the UK Information Commissioner's Office as a UK GDPR Certification Scheme.

In 2024 ADISA released the ADISA Academy, providing training resources for professionals managing risk during IT Asset Retirement and Recovery

== See also ==
- Data remanence
- Electronic waste
- Sanitization (classified information)
