= Soesterberg Principles =

The Soesterberg Principles was adopted by the Trans-Atlantic Network for Clean Production on May 16, 1999. It was a commitment that for new technical innovation in the industry, that innovation should also include improvements in the environment, health, and social issues that follow. It is an electronic sustainability commitment that technical improvements should correspond to environmental and health improvements. The Electronic Sustainability Commitment of the principles reads:

Each new generation of technical improvements in electronic products should include parallel and proportional improvements in environmental, health and safety as well as social attributes
