= Recycling in Japan =

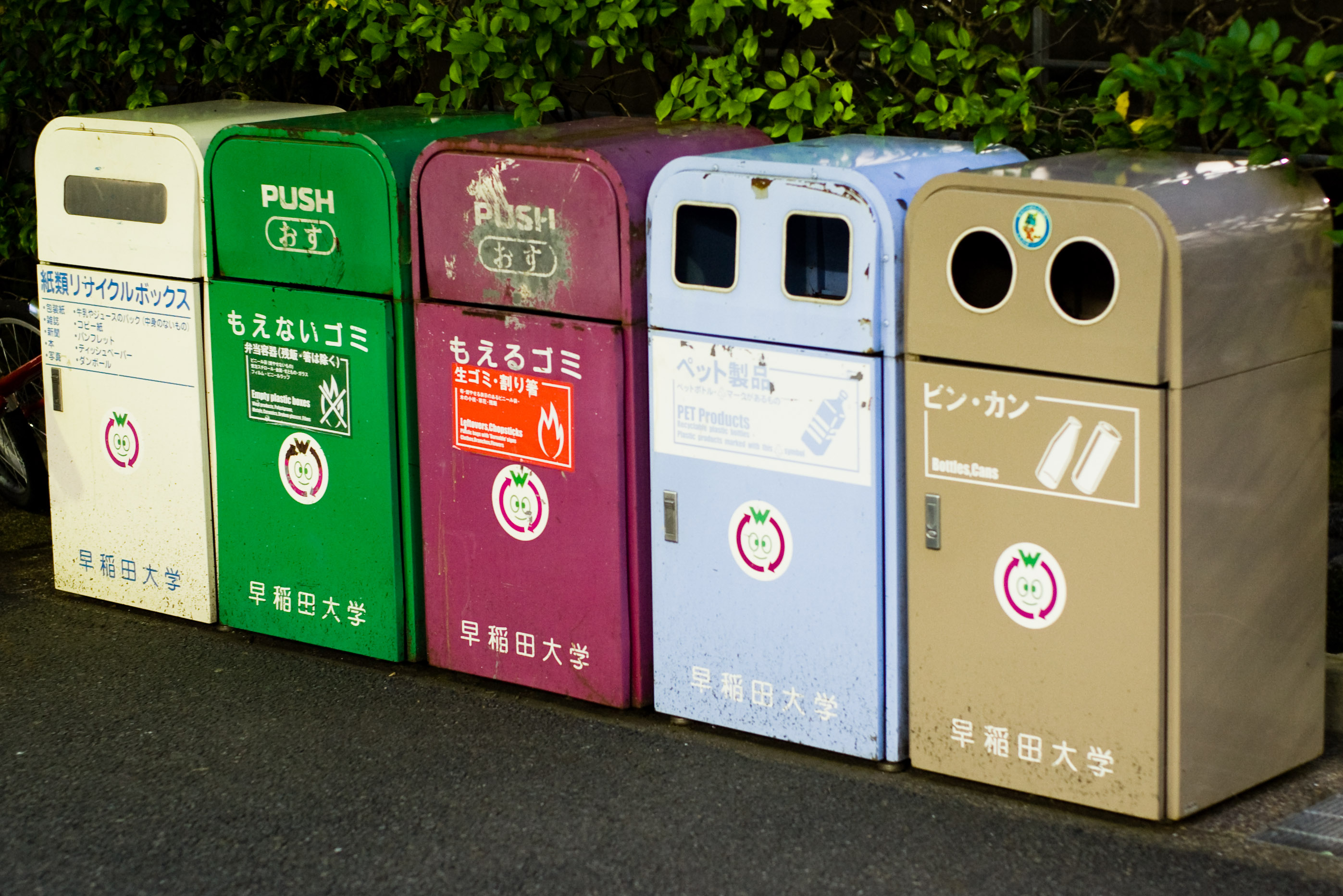
Recycling bins in Japan

Recycling in Japan (Japanese: リサイクル, romanized: Risaikuru), an aspect of waste management in Japan, is based on the Japanese Container and Packaging Recycling Law. Plastic, paper, PET bottles, aluminium and glass are collected and recycled. Japan's country profile in Waste Atlas shows that in 2012, the recycling rate was 20.8%.

== Container and Packaging Recycling Act ==
Also called Act on the Promotion of Sorted Collection and Recycling of Containers and Packaging, has been enforced since April 1997 by the Ministry of the Environment to reduce the waste of glass containers, PET bottles and paper cartons. Since April 2000 plastic containers and packages other than PET bottles have been included. According to the act, the recycling is conducted by the Japanese Container and Package Recycling Association (JCPRA) (財団法人日本容器包装リサイクル協会, Zaidan-hōjin Nihon-yōki-hōsō-risaikuru-kyōkai), a government-designated organization established September 25, 1996.

- The consumers are required to follow sorting guidelines established by the municipalities.
- The sorted waste is then collected by the municipalities and stored for collecting by the recycling company.
- Manufactures and business entities using containers and packages have to pay a recycling fee to the JCPRA, in accordance with the volume they manufacture or sell.
- Each year recycling business entities are selected by a public bidding in every local municipality where a waste storage site is located. They are assigned to collect and transport the waste from the storage sites to recycling facilities. To make sure the waste is getting recycled, these recycling business entities receive payment only after showing a delivery report, signed by the recipient of the recycled products.

Recycling of steel cans is not regulated by the law, but in 2006 about 99% of the municipalities collected and recycled them. In 1973 the Japan Steel Can Recycling Association (スチール缶リサイクル協会, Suchiiru-kan Risaikuru kyōkai), a non-profit organization to promote the recycling of steel cans, had been established. According to its statistics 88.1% of steel cans have been recycled in 2006, maintaining the world's highest level.

A report on the state of the Packaging Recycling Act in detail was produced in 2016.

Recycling 2009
Product	Volume of recycling tons	Change since 2000	Recycling unit costs ¥ / kg	Change since 2000
Glass bottles, no color	155,076	-16.04%	4.1	-1.23%
Glass bottles, brown	133,560	+43.62%	5.5	-28.40%
Glass bottles, other	107,383	+10.09%	9.2	+13.64%
PET bottles	257,906	+167.03%	1.7	-98.09%
Paper	33,934	-29.03%	13.3	-77.32%
Plastics	853,581	+463.53%	65.7	-37.43%

== Laws related to recycling ==
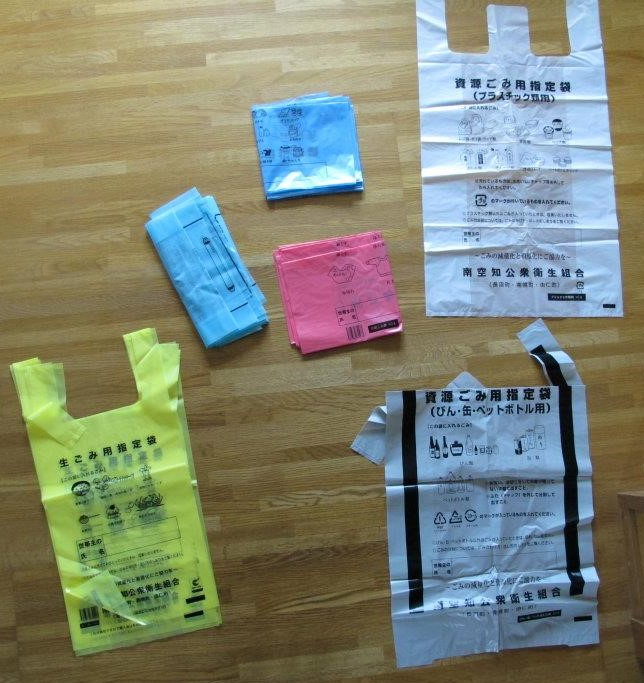
Households in some areas separate their waste and place it in special bags for collection.

- Specified Home Appliance Recycling Act [ja] - enacted June 1998, enforced April 2001 Covers air conditioners, television sets (CRT and LCD), refrigerators/freezers, and washing machines/clothes dryers.
- Act on Promotion of Recycling of Used Small Electronic Devices, etc. [ja] - enacted 2012 Covers medium and small electrical and electronic equipment.
- Act on Recycling of Materials Used in Construction Works [ja] - enacted May 2000 Covers concrete, asphalt concrete, wood building/construction materials
- Act on Promotion of Recycling of Food Resources [ja] - enacted 2000, revised 2007 Covers food waste from industries and business enterprises, but not household kitchen waste.
- Act on Recycling of End-of-Life Vehicles [ja] - enacted 2002 Covers automotive shredder residue, airbags, chlorofluorocarbons.
- Act on Promotion of Effective Utilization of Resources [ja] - enacted May 2000 replacing "Act on the Promotion of Effective Utilization of Resources", enforced April 2001. Covers designated resources-saving industries and resources-reutilizing industries; specified resources-saved products, reuse-promoted products, labeled products (required as shown in the Symbols section), resources-recycled products (to promote self-collection and recycling), and by-products (promote the use of by-products as recyclable resources); compact rechargeable batteries (sealed lead acid batteries, sealed nickel-cadmium batteries, sealed nickel-metal-hydride batteries, lithium batteries), personal computers (including CRTs and liquid crystal displays).
- Act on Promotion of Procurement of Eco-Friendly Goods by the State and Other Entities [ja] - enacted May 2000, enforced April 2001. Promotes purchase of recycled products.
- Act on Promotion of Resource Recycling of Plastics [ja] - The cabinet decided the bill in March 2021, and the act was enacted on June 11, 2021.

== Symbols ==
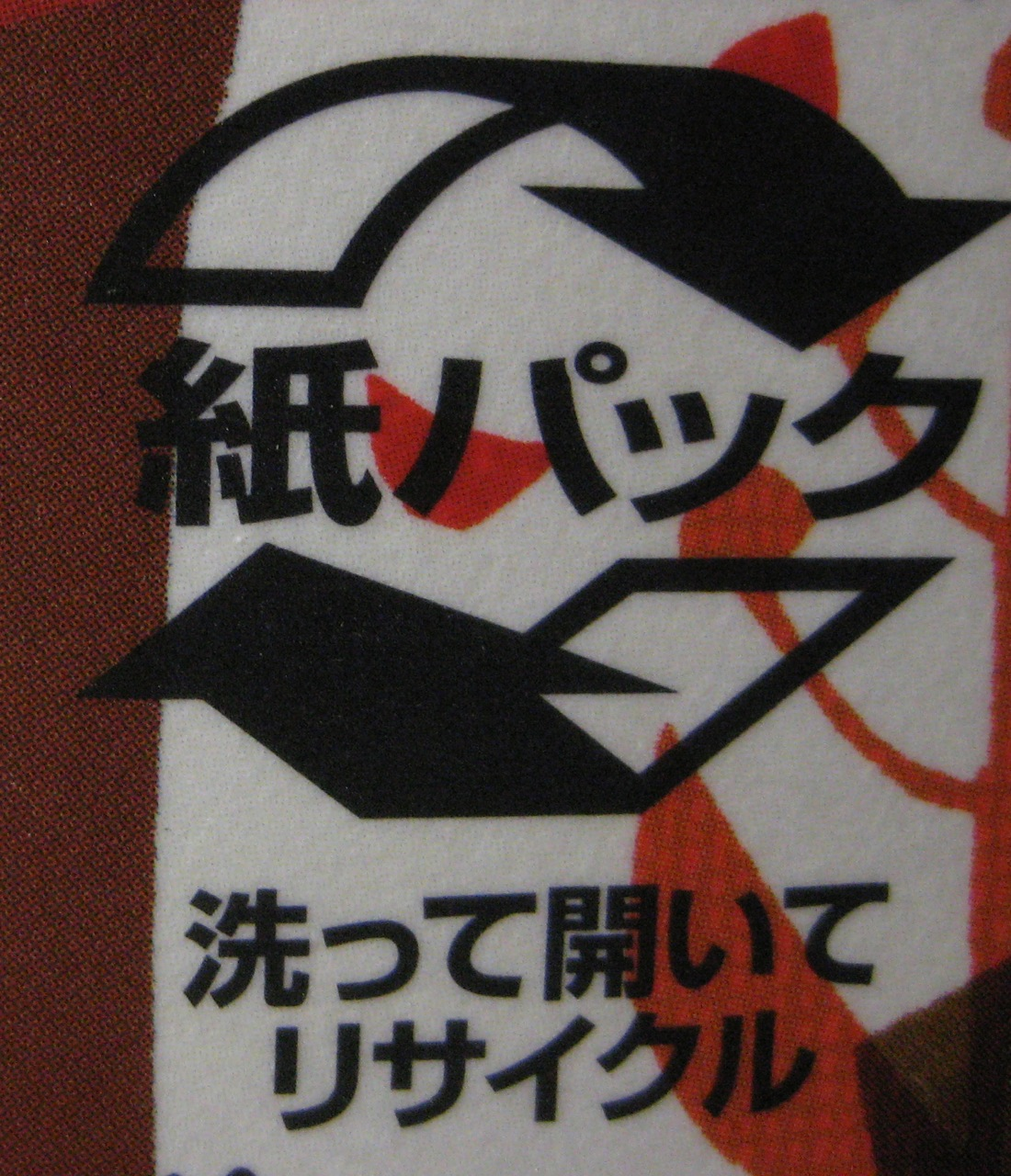
Recycling symbol on a paper carton (紙パック, Kami pakku)

Recycling symbols used in Japan
Paper (紙, Kami)
Plastic (プラ, Pura)
Aluminum (アルミ, Arumi)
Steel (スチール, Suchiiru)
PET bottles

== Recycling plans ==
On March 25, 2008, the Japanese Cabinet approved a plan that targets to reduce the total waste from about 52 million tons in 2007 to about 50 million tons in 2012 and to raise the waste recycling rate from 20 to 25%. Thermal recycling and a charging system for waste disposal services will be promoted.

=== 3R Initiative ===
This G8 initiative, first proposed at the G8 Summit in June 2004, aims to Reduce, Reuse and Recycle waste. At the G8 Environmental Minister Meeting in Kobe on May 24–26, 2008, the ministers agreed about the Kobe 3R Action plan. It intends to improve resource productivity, to establish an international sound material-cycle society and to bring forward 3Rs capacity in developing countries. According to this plan, Japan also announced a New Action Plan towards a Global Zero Waste Society, aimed to establish material cycle societies internationally.

The Japanese government set October as the official month for 3R promotions. This was done to specify and allocate deliberate time to encourage corporations and businesses to focus on the importance of reducing, reusing and recycling waste. During the promotion month, the government and other companies organise informative events and parties to publicise the ideas of a sound material-cycle society.

== Scandals ==
Five paper companies in Japan were accused of misleading customers about the recycled paper content of their products in 2008. Oji Paper, the largest paper company in Japan, admitted that its copy and print paper contained 5 to 10% recycled paper, instead of the 50% stated. The president of Oji Paper apologized to its customers, and the president of Nippon Pages, the second largest paper company in Japan, resigned to take responsibility. The Japanese Fair Trade Commission said it would investigate.

== See also ==
- Recycling
- Sound Material-Cycle Society
- Waste management in Japan
- Electronic waste in Japan
- Mottainai - common Japanese expression, often used in this context
