= Aluminium recycling =

Reuse of scrap aluminium

An aluminium recycling symbol

The European Committee for Standardization logo for aluminium recycling

Aluminium recycling is the process in which secondary commercial aluminium is created from scrap or other forms of end-of-life or otherwise unusable aluminium. It involves re-melting the metal, which is cheaper and more energy-efficient than the production of virgin aluminium by electrolysis of alumina (Al_{2}O_{3}) refined from raw bauxite by use of the Bayer and Hall–Héroult processes.

Recycling scrap aluminium requires only 5% of the energy used to make new aluminium from the raw ore. In 2022, the United States produced 3.86 metric tons of secondary aluminium for every metric ton of primary aluminium produced. Over the same time period, secondary aluminium accounted for 34% of the total new supply of aluminium including imports. Used beverage containers are the largest component of processed aluminium scrap, and most of it is manufactured back into aluminium cans.

== Recycling process ==
=== Collection & sorting ===
The first step in aluminium recycling is the collection and sorting of aluminium scrap from various sources. Scrap aluminium comes primarily from either manufacturing scrap or end-of-life aluminium products such as vehicles, building materials, and consumer products. Manufacturing scrap includes shreds, shavings, cuttings, and other leftover aluminium from manufacturing processes. Post-consumer scrap consists of obsolete or discarded aluminium products. Aluminium cans, in particular, are a major source of recyclable aluminium scrap. Once collected, aluminium scrap is sorted based on alloy type, grade, impurity levels, and other factors. Sorting may be done manually or using technologies like eddy current separators, air classifiers, and density separators. The scrap is sorted into categories like wrought alloy scrap, casting alloy scrap, used beverage cans, automobile scrap, and mixed scrap. Proper sorting is essential for producing high-quality recycled aluminium.

=== Pre-treatment ===
After sorting, the scrap may undergo pre-treatment processes to prepare it for melting. These can include baling, shredding, crushing, granulating, decoating, and demagnetizing. Shredding and crushing reduce the particle size of the scrap and liberate it from other materials, while granulating produces fine particles ideal for melting. Thermal decoating removes coatings like paint and plastic from aluminium surfaces. Demagnetizing removes iron particles clinging to the aluminium scrap. Pre-treatment improves the density of the scrap charge and removes contaminants, resulting in faster melting, cleaner metal, reduced dross formation, and lower energy consumption.

=== Melting ===
Once pre-treated, the aluminium scrap undergoes melting and liquid metal treatment to produce refined aluminium alloy suitable for casting or reprocessing. Different furnace types are used based on the type of scrap, desired metal quality, and economics. Smaller scrap is typically processed in rotary or reverberatory gas-fired furnaces, while large individual pieces of scrap can be charged directly into reverb furnaces through side wells. Electric induction furnaces are also used. As the scrap melts, fluxes are added to bind and absorb impurities which are scraped off the top as dross. Chlorine gas may also be injected to remove impurities through flotation. The melt can then undergo refining processes like flux injection to further reduce hydrogen and impurities. Degassing removes dissolved hydrogen while chemical filtration removes solid impurities and inclusions. The final result is molten aluminium alloy ready for casting.

=== Casting ===
The molten recycled aluminium is cast into solid forms such as ingots, sows, or directly into sheets or extrusion billets. Direct-chill casting is commonly used to solidify the liquid aluminium into large cylindrical billets for extrusion or rolling. The direct chill method sprays water onto the hot metal as it exits the mold, quickly chilling it into a solid billet form. For ingots, book molds are often used, producing slabbed ingots suitable for remelting or rolling. Continuous casting directly shapes the aluminium into rolling slabs without an intermediate ingot casting step. Twin-belt or twin-roll strip casting produces alloy strips 6-7mm thick directly from the melt for subsequent rolling. The casting method depends on the subsequent processing and use of the recycled aluminium alloy.

== History ==
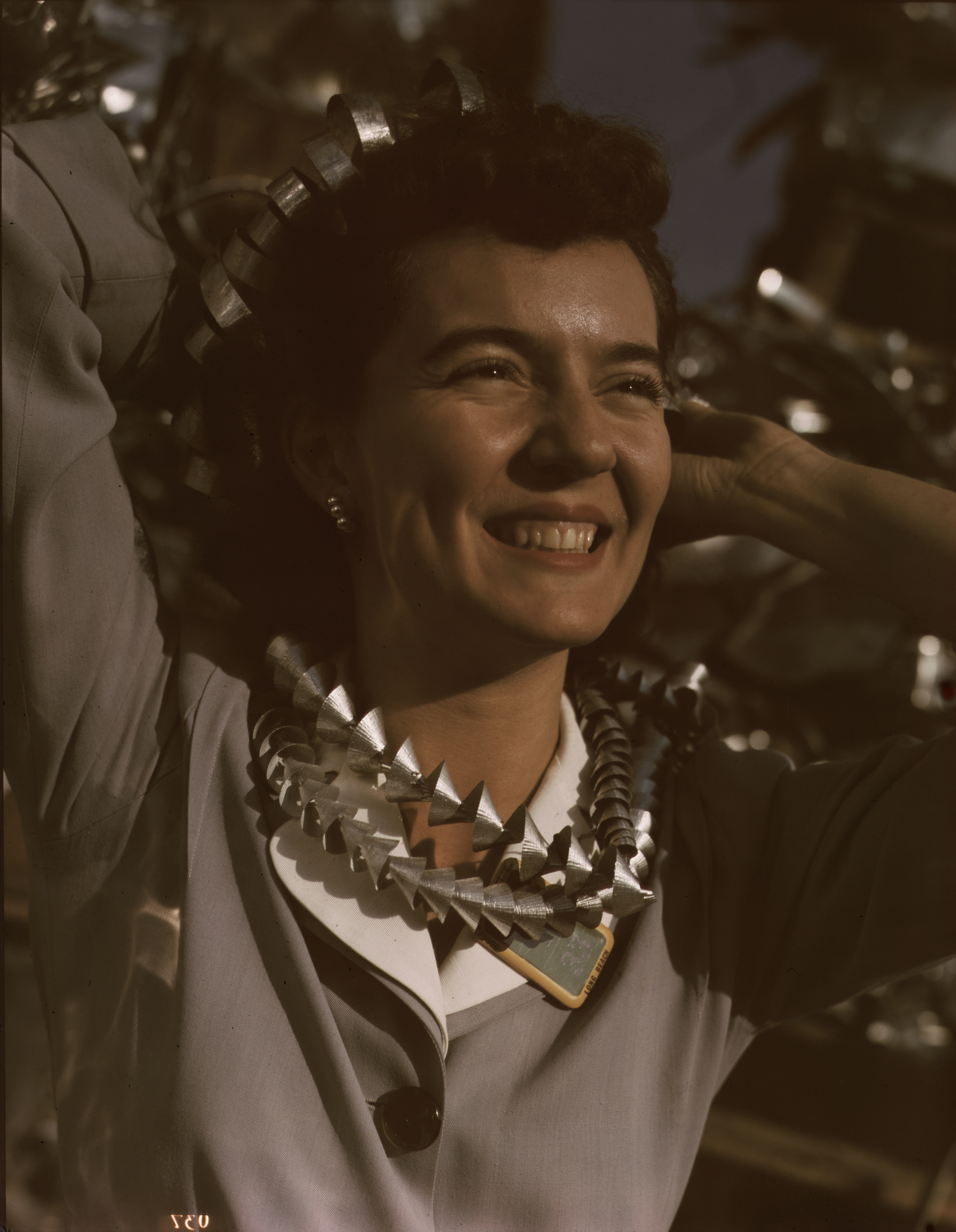
Model promoting aluminium recycling at Douglas Aircraft Company in 1942

Although aluminium in its pure form has been produced as early as 1825, secondary aluminium production, or recycling, rose in volume with the introduction of industrially viable primary aluminium processes, namely the combination of the Bayer and Hall-Héroult processes. The Hall-Héroult process for aluminium production from alumina was invented in 1886 by Charles Hall and Paul Héroult. Carl Josef Bayer created a multi-step process to convert raw bauxite into alumina in 1888. As aluminium production rose with the use of these two processes, aluminium recycling grew too. In 1904, the first two aluminium can recycling plants were built in the United States; one recycling plant was built in Chicago, Illinois and the other was built in Cleveland, Ohio. Aluminium recycling increased most significantly in volume when metal resources were strained during WWI, as the U.S. government campaigned for civilians to donate old products such as aluminium pots, pans, boats, vehicles, and toys to recycle for the construction of aluminium airframes.

== Advantages ==
Aluminium is an infinitely recyclable material, and it takes up to 95 percent less energy to recycle it than to produce primary aluminium, which also limits emissions, including greenhouse gases. Today, about 75 percent of all aluminium produced in history, nearly a billion tons, is still in use.

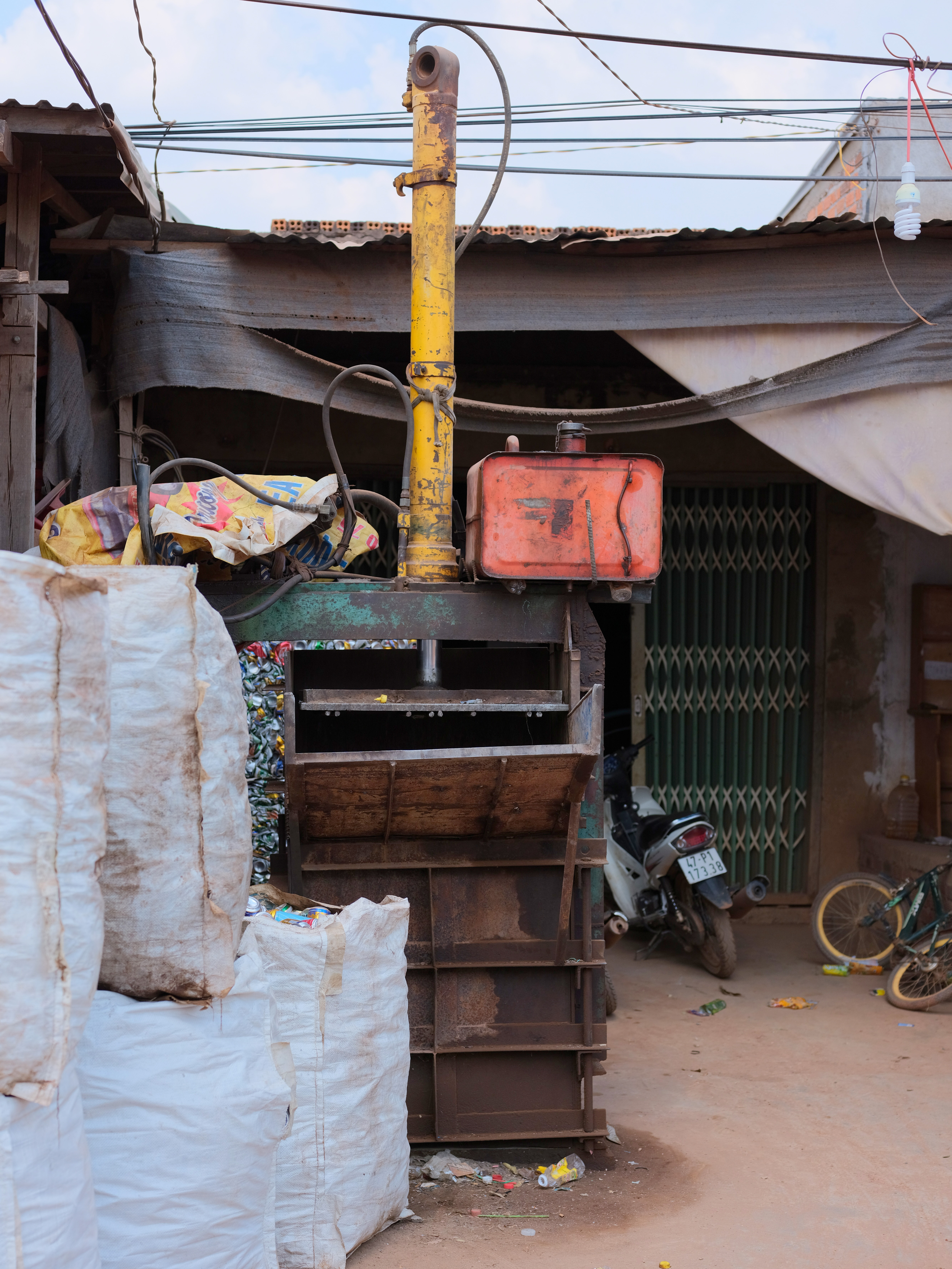
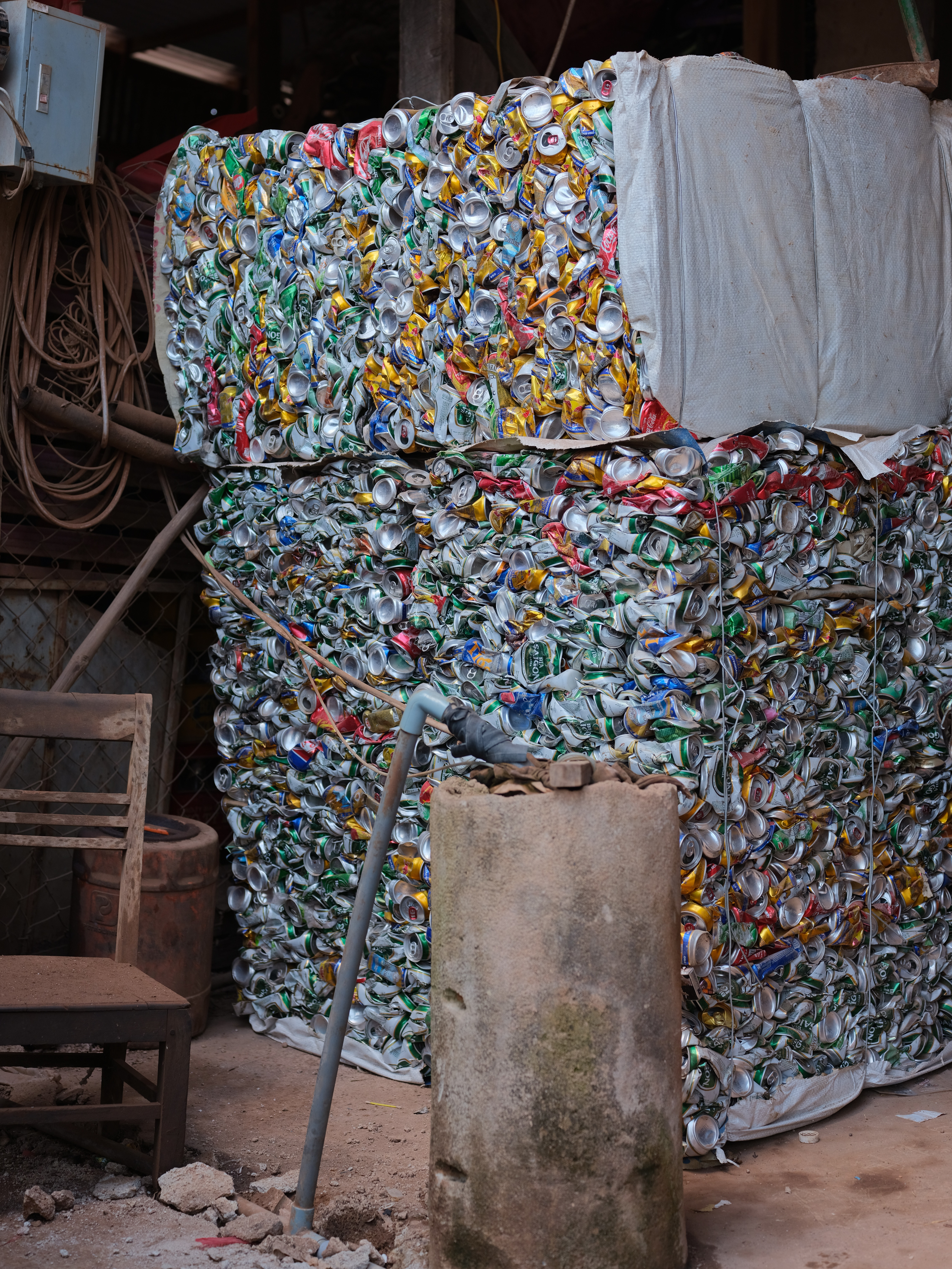
Hydraulic press and baled cans prepared for transport

The recycling of aluminium generally produces significant cost savings over the production of new aluminium, even when the cost of collection, separation and recycling are taken into account. Over the long term, even larger national savings are made when the reduction in the capital costs associated with landfills, mines, and international shipping of raw aluminium are considered.

=== Energy savings ===
Recycling aluminium uses about 5% of the energy required to create aluminium from bauxite; the amount of energy required to convert aluminium oxide into aluminium can be vividly seen when the process is reversed during the combustion of thermite or ammonium perchlorate composite propellant.

Aluminium die extrusion is a specific way of getting reusable material from aluminium scraps but does not require a large energy output of a melting process. In 2003, half of the products manufactured with aluminium were sourced from recycled aluminium material.

=== Environmental savings ===
The benefit with respect to emissions of carbon dioxide depends in part on the type of energy used. Electrolysis can be done using electricity from non-fossil-fuel sources, such as nuclear, geothermal, hydroelectric, or solar. Aluminium production is attracted to sources of cheap electricity. Canada, Brazil, Norway, and Venezuela have 61 to 99% hydroelectric power and are major aluminium producers. However the anodes widely used in the Hall–Héroult process are made of carbon and are consumed during aluminium production, generating large quantities of carbon dioxide, regardless of electricity source. Efforts are underway to eliminate the need for carbon anodes. The use of recycled aluminium also decreases the need for mining and refining bauxite.

The vast amount of aluminium used means that even small percentage losses are large expenses, so the flow of material is well monitored and accounted for financial reasons. Efficient production and recycling benefits the environment as well.

== Impact ==
=== Environmental ===
Because many countries continue to rely on coal-generated electricity for aluminium production, the aluminium industry contributes to 2% of global greenhouse gas emissions, around 1.1 billion tons of carbon dioxide. Many countries now seek to decarbonize aluminium not only as it is the second most used metal in the world, but also because it would heavily address the total greenhouse gas emissions in an effort to slow climate change.

As one of the most recyclable –and recycled– materials in use today, aluminium can be virtually infinitely recycled. Since recycled aluminium takes 5% of the energy used to make new aluminium, around 75% of aluminium manufactured continues to be in use today. According to the Aluminium Association, in industrial markets such as automotive and building, aluminium is recycled at rates of up to 90%.

Since 1991, greenhouse gas emissions from aluminium cans have dropped about 40%, similar to energy demand levels. This can be attributed to a reduction in the carbon intensity of primary aluminium production, improving the efficacy of manufacturing operations, and lighter cans. While primary aluminium only accounts for 26.6% of the can, it makes up the major source of the can's carbon footprint. For example, as of 2020, 86% of China's aluminium production relies mostly on coal-generated electricity. On the other hand, Canada sources roughly 90% of its primary aluminium production using hydroelectric power, considering it to be the most sustainable in the world.

Aluminium and its applications are wide and numerous–from defense construction and electrical transmission to playing a key role in emission-reducing goods (electric vehicles and solar panels). As such, countries have begun to decarbonize aluminium to combat global climate change.

=== Economic ===
Aluminium recycling has several economic benefits when done properly. In fact, the Environmental Protection Agency considers recycling a "critical" part of the United States economy, contributing to tax revenue, wages, and job creation. By facilitating scrap handling and improving its efficiency – from "end of life" scrap to repurposing scrap throughout the production stage ("in-house" scrap) – aluminium recycling helps in achieving the goals of a circular economy. This type of economy focuses on minimizing the extraction of natural resources, leading to a reduction of consumer and industrial waste. A few examples of countries that have adopted the shift to a circular economy include the European Union, Finland, France, Slovenia, Italy, Germany, and the Netherlands.

A study conducted in the United States found several ways that aluminium recycling has proven to have economic benefits. The process increased the wages of waste management and the recycling industry from $2.1 billion to $5 billion, created more than 100,000 jobs in the United States economy, and produced $1.6 billion in material sales. It also saves enough energy to power 1.5 million homes per year, and keeps more than 1 million tons of waste out of landfills every year.

== Recycling rates ==
According to 2020 data from the International Aluminium Institute, the global recycling efficiency rate is 76%. Around 75% of the almost 1.5 billion tonnes of aluminium ever produced is still in productive use today.

Brazil recycles 98.2% of its aluminium can production, equivalent to 14.7 billion beverage cans per year, ranking first in the world, more than Japan's 82.5% recovery rate. Brazil has topped the aluminium can recycling charts eight years in a row.

=== Europe ===
Recycling rate for aluminium beverage cans in 2023
Country	%	
Country	Austria	73%
Belgium	95%	
Bulgaria	63%	
Croatia	80%	
Cyprus	26%	
Czech Republic	30%	
Denmark	88%	
Estonia	85%	
Finland	99%	
France	60%	
Greece	60%	
Germany	99%	
Hungary	37%	
Iceland	96%	
Italy	94%	
Ireland	60%	
Latvia	74%	
Lithuania	91%	
Luxembourg	71%	
Malta	80%	
Netherlands	69%	
Norway	96%	
Poland	81%	
Portugal	41%	
Romania	35%	
Slovenia	80%	
Slovakia	91%	
Spain	65%	
Sweden	90%	
Switzerland	91%	
United Kingdom	81%	
Europe	76.3%	

== Challenges ==
Aside from recycled aluminium beverage cans, the majority of recycled aluminium comes in a mixture of different alloys. Those alloys generally have high percentages of silicon (Si) and require additional refinement during the shredding, sorting, and refining process to reduce impurities. Due to the levels of impurities found after refinement, the applications of recycled aluminium alloys are limited to castings and extrusions. The aerospace industry often restrict impurity levels of Si and Fe in alloys to a 0.40% maximum. Controlling the appearance of these elements is increasingly difficult the more often the metal has been recycled and require higher cost operations for the alloys to meet performance requirements.

Beverage can top uses a different alloy blend than the body. As of 2020, this limits the recycled content to about 90%. The addition of new primary aluminum is needed to maintain the alloying composition in the recycled product.

=== Byproducts ===
White dross, a residue from primary aluminium production and secondary recycling operations, usually classified as waste, still contains useful quantities of aluminium which can be extracted industrially. The process produces aluminium billets, together with a highly complex waste material. This waste is difficult to manage. It reacts with water, releasing a mixture of gases (including, among others, hydrogen, acetylene, and ammonia) which spontaneously ignites on contact with air; contact with damp air results in the release of copious quantities of ammonia gas. Despite these difficulties, however, the waste has found use as a filler in asphalt and concrete.

== See also ==
- Environmental issues with mining
- Ferrous metal recycling
- Reverse vending machine
