= Electronic waste in Japan =

Discarded electronic devices in Japan

Electronic waste in Japan is a major environmental issue. Although Japan was one of the first countries to implement an electronic waste recycling program, it is still having serious issues. In this day and age, e-waste disposal has become of major importance due to the increasing demand for electronics on a worldwide scale. In 2013, the Japanese government reported that roughly 550 thousand tonnes (540,000 long tons; 610,000 short tons) of e-waste was collected and treated in Japan, which only equates to about 24-30% of total e-waste. Not only does e-waste harm the environment if untreated, it also becomes a fiscal loss due to the material lost that could have been salvaged.

Much of Japan's e-waste is actually exported to neighboring countries. By developing new recycling initiatives, Japan can turn trash into treasure and help the environment at the same time. These recycling initiatives are important because handling e-waste is not an easy process, or a safe one. Over the years, Japan has been working to develop safe and efficient waste management programs to handle this e-waste. Despite these efforts, there have still been serious problems surrounding the environmental and health issues regarding e-waste in Japan.

== E-waste processing ==
=== Sources of E-waste ===
Japan has quickly become one of the most wasteful nations in the world according to Basel Action Network's executive director Jim Puckett. As the country continues to progressively manufacture and consume more electronic goods, the e-waste generated from these goods grows as well. Japan ranks as the third most wasteful country in the world by volume behind the United States and China. Wastes are broadly divided into three different categories that consist of industrials, non-industrials, and hazardous. E-waste falls into the category of non-industrial wastes and is recognized as "electrical and electronic wastes," or "bulky trash". Some e-waste sources include refrigerators, televisions, air conditioning units, and washing machines.

=== Treatment ===
The Association for Electric Home Appliances developed the home appliance recycling ticket system which is the foundation of e-waste recycling and treatment. This ticketing system was installed to ensure that relevant parties would forward smoother home appliance recycling activities under the Law for the Recycling of Specified Kinds of Home Appliances (LRHA). Although it is one system, it comes in two types. The first type requires consumers to pay recycling and transportation fees to the retailer and the second type requires them to pay recycling fees through postal transfer. The cost of transportation as well as the recycling of the e-waste when discarding home appliances is the responsibility of the consumer with recycling fees typically ranging from 2,500 to 5,000 yen. Manufactures are responsible for establishing their own recycling facilities.

Although manufacturers are responsible for establishing recycling infrastructure for home appliances, the specific method is not regulated. Therefore, the responses can be divided into two vague groups: Group A and Group B. The two different methods help to enable competition and create new recycling processes by providing about 200 national collection sites with dissimilar viewpoints on reducing costs. In the broadest terms, Group A aims to keep cost down through maximum utilization of existing waste management companies, while Group B attempts to cut costs by adopting efficient logistics systems.

== Current legislation ==
The foundation of Japanese e-waste recycling contains two elements; the first is the Law for the Promotion of Effective Utilization of Resources (LPUR) and the other is the Law for the Recycling of Specified Kinds of Home Appliances (LRHA). The first law was most recently revised in 2001, called the Law for the Promotion of Effective Utilization of Resources (LPUR). This law encourages manufacturers to voluntarily help recycle goods and reduce the generation of the waste. The second law became effective on April 1, 2009, called the Law for the Recycling of Specified Kinds of Home Appliances (LRHA). This law imposes more requirements on the recycling efforts of both consumers and manufacturers of home appliances. In October, 2003, taxes were imposed on any computer purchased after that date. If a computer was purchased before that date, those wanting to recycle their computer would pay a nominal fee to keep up with recycling costs.

=== Law for the Promotion of Effective Utilization of Resources ===
LPUR was instituted in 2000 as a means to promote the reduction of waste generation, reuse of parts, and recycling. More specifically, it aims to establish a recycling-based economic system by reusing parts of collected products, strengthening collection methods, and introducing new measures to reduce wastes and extending product life span. These basic policies are formulated and publicized by relevant ministers, such as the minister of the businesses and the Minister of the Environment and are followed by parties involved with e-waste. These four parties concerned are businesses, consumers, the national government, and the local government.

Businesses must rationalize the use of raw materials as well as use reusable parts and recyclable resources. Consumers are responsible for facilitating the use of these recyclables and using products for the entirety of their lifespan. The national government holds the most responsibility as they shall take care of proper funding for recycling and treatment, take necessary action to promote research and development, and encourage the public to do their research and recycle and reuse. The local government holds similar responsibilities as the national government, but on a smaller scale.

=== Law for the Recycling of Specified Kinds of Home Appliances ===
The Law for the Recycling of Specified Kinds of Home Appliances (LRHA) became effective in 2009 as a way to enforce rules on the production of products such as CRT television receivers, household air conditioners, washing machines, and refrigerators. More specifically, LRHA was created to create a recycling scheme in which the main principle is to newly impose obligations on home appliance manufactures and retailers. These manufacturers and retailers are pressured by this law to ensure proper waste treatment and efficient use of resources. LRHA outlines which kinds of home appliances are regulated, the responsibilities of the parties involved, whom include waste generators, retailers, manufacturers, the Association for Electric Home Appliances, and city governments, as well as the standards for recycling and regulating the coupon system.

Waste generators, which include business operators and consumers, must transfer necessary appliances to retailers and pay necessary recycling and collection fee demanded by the retailers. Retailers must take back sold appliances, deliver home appliances, and issue recycling coupons. Manufactures and importers are responsible for to take back manufactured appliances from retailers, recycle appliances, and make recycling fees public. The Association for Electric Home Appliances must recycle appliances in which the manufacturer is unknown as well as appliances entrusted by specific manufactures whose production volume is less than 900,000 units for television sets and air conditioners and 450,000 units for washing machines and refrigerators. Governments are responsible for promoting the collection, transportation, and recycling of used home appliances.

LRHA is also responsible for setting recycling standards. All home appliances that are taken back must meet minimum recycling rate requirements. In regards to the LRHA law, recycling rate refers to the weight of materials recycled divided by the weight of units processed for recycling. The minimum required recycling rates are 70% for air conditioners, 55% for televisions, 60% for refrigerators and freezers, and 65% for washing machines.

The home appliance recycling coupon system ensures that the listed home appliances are transferred from retailers to manufactures in an appropriate manner. This allows for consumers and businesses to check whether recycling is performed properly or not.

== Recycling process ==
The utilization of electronic waste resources is around 50% currently and is growing. The LRHA states that consumers are responsible for the cost of recycling most home appliances. This includes transportation costs and recycling fees. The consumers pay the retailers to pick up the waste. They then recycle it and the consumers pay the related fees. In order to make the system more balanced, if a consumer asks a retailer to take the used home appliance for any reason (most likely because they purchased a new appliance), the retailer is obligated to pick it up. The retailers usually take it back to the manufacturer. The manufacturer is required to have a system in place to recycle the electronic waste, and this system must also maintain a certain percentage of utilization from these resources. Part of this process is not regulated by the government, and that is the process of acquiring a recycling facility and/or how the recycling is currently done. Manufacturers can hire anyone they want to build the facility and they can also recycle electronic waste in any way they deem fit. The only thing it must maintain is the amount of utilization from each material that comes into the facility. The manufacturers often want to recycle the products in the cheapest way possible and this leaves a lot of room for improvement.

== Future use and alternatives ==
Today, Japan has one of the highest recycling rates in all of Asia, but these numbers are more closely related to the recycling of plastics, paper, and glass. Of the 650,000 tons of home appliances and small electronics discarded per year, less than 100,000 tons are actually collected for recycling. With this, new ideas and initiatives have been developed to counteract this huge gap.

With the Olympics heading to Japan in 2020, there have been strong suggestions towards using e-waste in the gold medals. Although the IOC requires that each medal contain at least six grams of gold, Japan's Olympic organizing committee believes that the idea is a feasible one.

== See also ==
- Waste management in Japan
- Environmental issues in Japan
- Electronic waste
