= Recycling in Brazil =

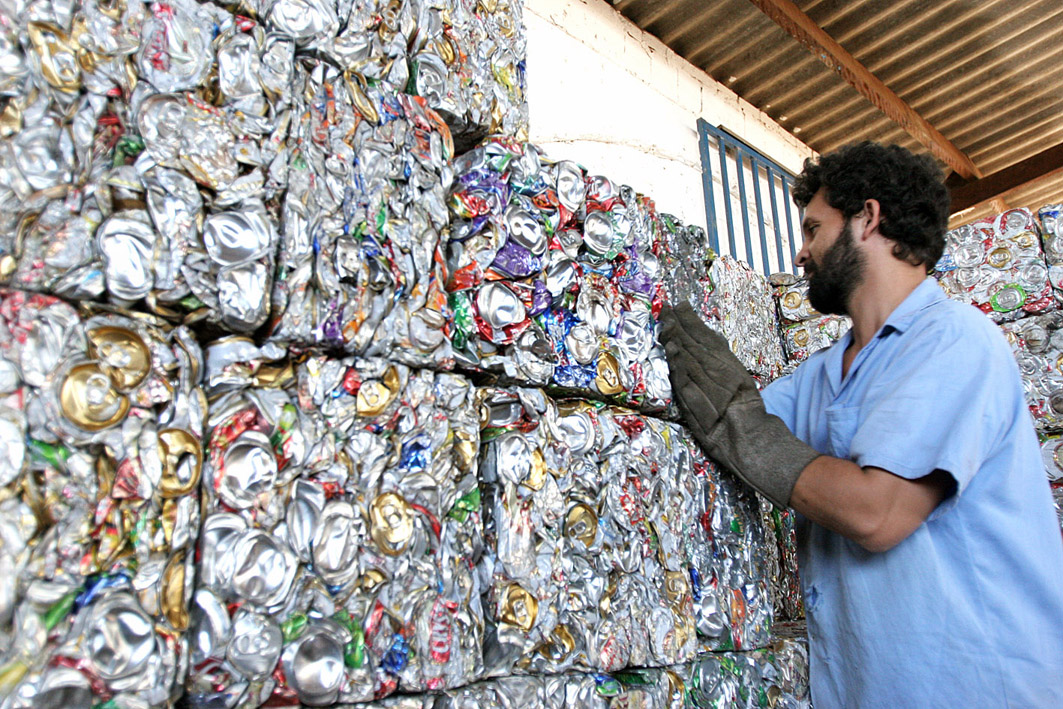
Baled aluminum cans in Brazilian recycling facility

Brazil's overall recycling rate is 4%, according to Abrelpe (Associação Brasileira de Empresas de Limpeza Pública e Resíduos Especiais) but differs a lot from city to city. Only 60.5% of Brazilian municipalities with waste management services offer recycling collection. More than 70% of Brazilians do not separate their recyclable materials into proper bins. The recovery of recyclable material is largely left to waste pickers, who earn a living by collecting recyclables and selling them to private recycling companies. Recycling has difficulties advancing in Brazil. Only 41.4% of the population has access to selective collection.

Main businesses in Brazil are taking a lead role in organizing recycling collection in the country's major cities. In 1992, private companies from various areas established the Brazilian Business Commitment for Recycling (CEMPRE), a nonprofit organization work for the promotion of recycling within the scope of comprehensive waste management as an initiative to build a better environmental image for their associates. CEMPRE tries to increase the community's awareness of recycling and other solid waste issues through publications, technical research, seminars, and databases.

== National Regulations ==
Brazilian National Policy on Solid Waste was enacted in 2010. This law introduced guidelines for solid waste management and shared responsibility for products over their life cycle.

Decree No. 12.688, signed into law in 2025, mandates recycling for plastic packaging. Specifically regulating articles 32 and 33, it mandates reverse logistics systems and shared responsibility for manufacturers, importers, distributors, and traders to ensure products and packaging return to the business sectors for either safe disposal or recycling/ reuse after consumer use. This mandate sets national targets for the amount of recycled content that must be present in new plastic packaging. For 2026 the target is 32% recovery, and the goal slowly increases until 2040, where the goal is 50%.

== Materials ==
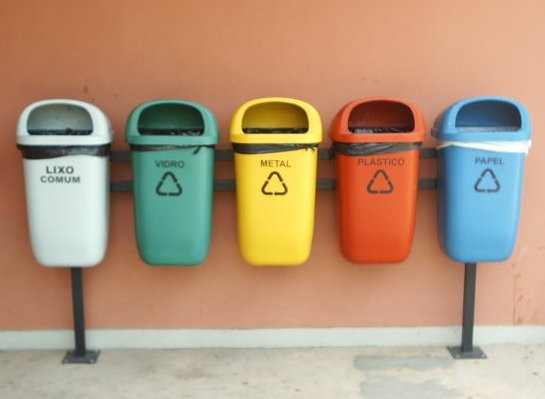
Sorted waste containers

Brazil is one of the countries with the lowest recycling rates in the world, behind Yemen and Syria and well below the world average, which is 9%. In Brazil, the main materials for reprocessing are aluminum, steel, glass, paper and plastics. They also recycle batteries, cooking oil, laminated material, refrigerators and so on. The results of plastic recycling are significantly low, but the aluminum recycling rate is one of the highest in the world.

=== Paper ===
The paper industry in Brazil is responsible for 1% of the GDP. In 2023, Brazil recycled 4.65 million tons, or 58-64%, of the paper materials produced that year. Taking into consideration only the paper used in packaging, the recycling rate is even higher at 70 percent. In Brazil, industries consume 2.8 million tons of recycled paper. The paper recycling amount in Brazil varies greatly from area to area. In the south and southeast area, rates of recycling are high, at 64% and 44% respectively; whereas it is 16% in other areas.

=== Aluminum cans ===
In 2021, the country managed to recycle 98.7% of aluminum cans, which represents approximately 33 billion aluminum cans. Since 1990, this is the highest rate in the history of can recycling, and is also one of the highest in the world.

Aluminum is collected and stored by a chain of about 2,000 scrap collectors. 50% of the collectors are industries, and the others are supermarkets, schools, companies, and charitable entities. Despite the excellent result with aluminum cans, recycling of other products is still widely low.

=== Steel cans ===
In Brazil, just 5% of drink cans are made of steel. In 2007, Brazil's recycling rate for steel cans was 49 percent. The total fraction of steel recycled in Brazil, including steel from old cars, household electronics, and building waste, is estimated to be 70%.

=== Tires ===
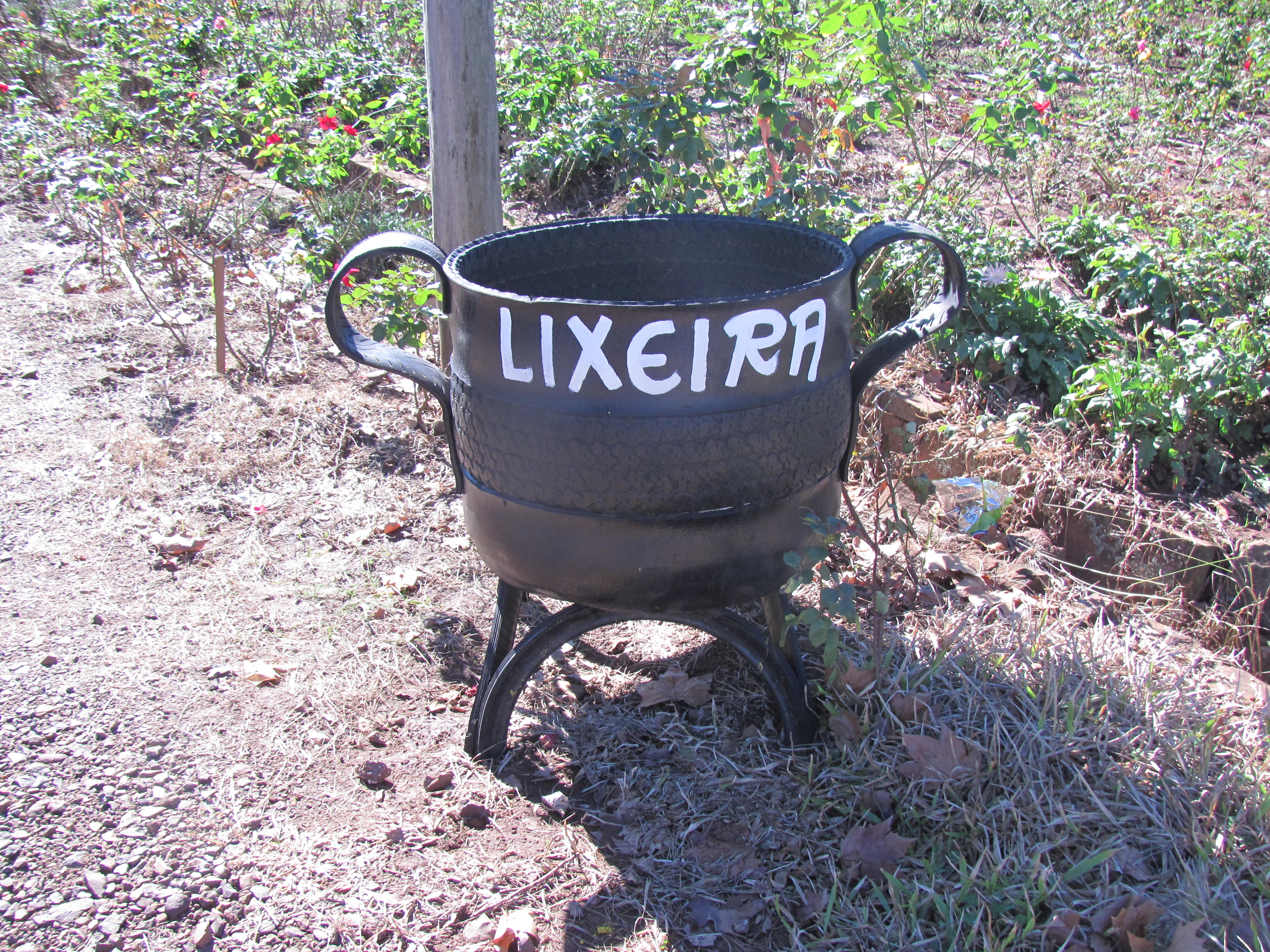
Waste receptacle made from tires.

57% of the 260,000 tones of used tires estimated to be thrown away each year in Brazil were sent to cement ovens in Brazil. In Brazil, used tires are applied to make artificial reefs in the sea, to increase fisheries production. Energy can be recovered by burning the tires in controlled ovens, because each tire contains the energy of 9.4 liters of petroleum oil.

=== Plastic ===
Brazil is the 4th largest producer of plastic waste in the world, behind only the United States, China and India. Brazil produces about 11.3 million tons of plastic waste yearly, but only 1.2% is recycled. Every Brazilian produces around 1 kg of plastic waste weekly. Also, 60% of the recycled plastic comes from industrial residue and 40% from urban refuse.

=== Refrigerators ===
There is a comprehensive refrigerator recycling program in Brazil. They recycle refrigerators and freezers in order to reduce potential global warming, because they contain chlorofluorocarbons (CFCs), which are ozone layer depleting gases with extremely high global warming potential (GWP).

=== Electronic waste ===
Brazil is the largest producer of e-waste in South America. In 2019 Brazil produced 2.1 million tons of e-waste. Inefficient recycling strategies have led to recycling only 3.6% of all e-waste generated, only around 77,000 tons in 2019. Electronic waste is a rapidly growing problem and also an opportunity for new markets in recycling and valorization. Mining e-waste has proven to be cheaper and more sustainable than traditional mining.

Waste electrical and electronic equipment (WEEE) contain materials of strategic and economic importance. These span from rare earth metals like gold, silver, platinum, palladium, as well as more ubiquitous metals like tin, copper, iron, aluminum, among others. By extracting the WEEE from disposed electronic waste, Brazil would have access to greater and more sustained quantities of WEEE for promoting a circular economy. Even though Brazil has some e-waste recycling facilities, they also export valuable components that contain rare earth metals like gold to Europe or North America for recovery by more advanced large-scale facilities.

In 2010 the Brazilian Policy on Solid Waste was enacted. This public policy created the first national regulations on e-waste management in South America. Key changes of this policy include Extended Producer Responsibility (EPR), putting more responsibility on producers of electronics to collect and recycle e-waste. Despite having policy passed, implementation remains inconsistent due to lack of government monitoring and infrastructure.

== Waste pickers ==
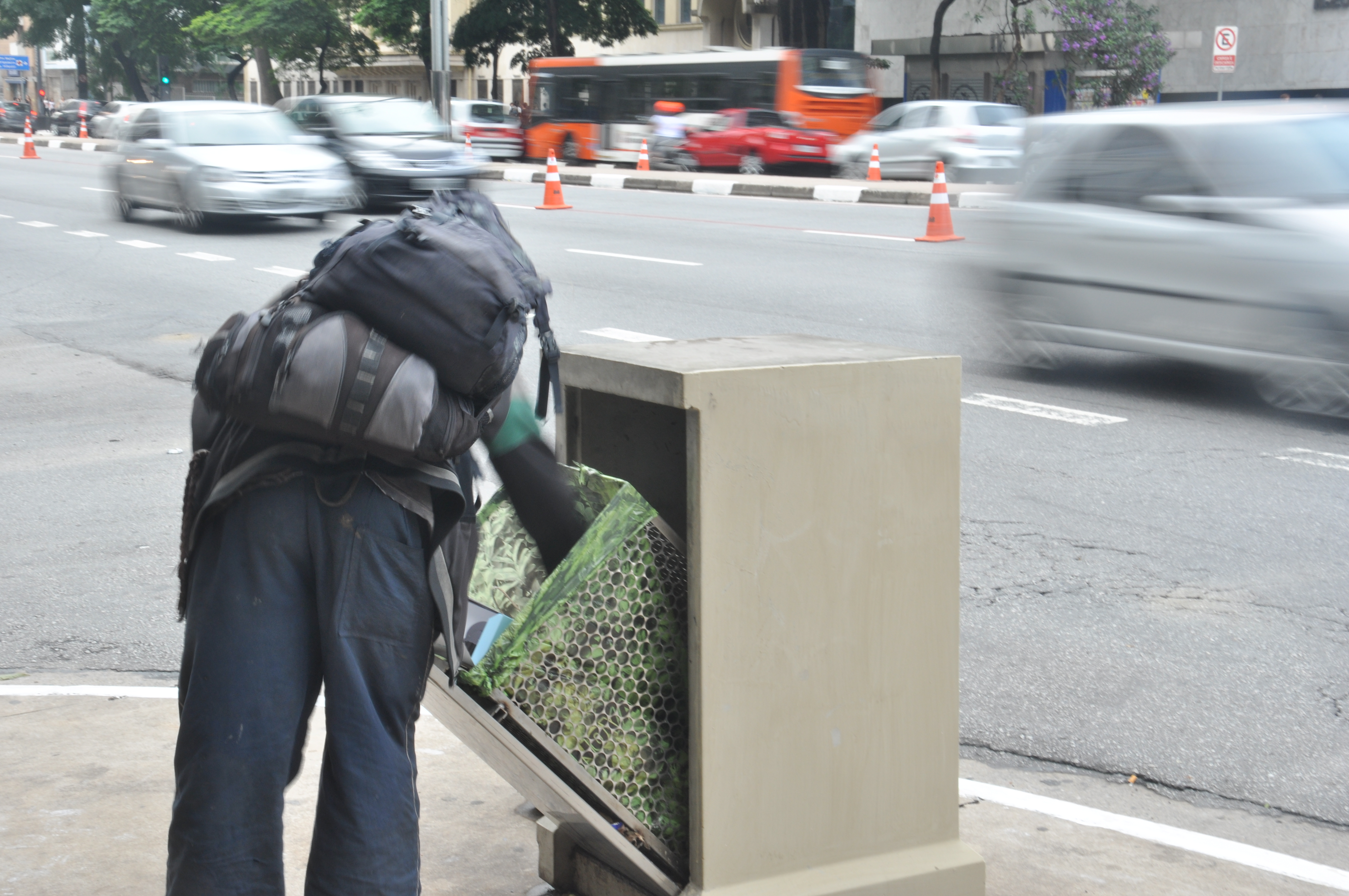
Waste picker

Waste pickers are individuals who make a living off of collecting recyclable materials. The collection of recyclable materials in Brazil is largely from waste pickers. In Brazil, waste picking is now recognized as an occupation, and organized waste pickers are seen as legitimate stakeholders who can voice their opinions at the local, state, and national levels. However, since the recognition of waste pickers as a formal profession, academic authors note a failure of improvements for waste pickers lives and working conditions.

=== Health and socio-economic problems ===
Waste pickers are a vulnerable population. They experience poverty at higher rates than the surrounding populations, are exposed to high concentrations of heavy metals, and experience injuries and sickness at higher rates from their occupation.

Waste pickers are consistently of low educational and socio-economic status, and frequently live in impoverished conditions. 73.6% of waste pickers report having eaten food from the garbage. 84.7% of waste pickers live where environmental conditions are poor (crowded or lack of sewage system). 11.2% report living in waste deposits and 4.1% lived on the streets.

A 2019 study of 1,025 waste pickers in the largest dump in Brazil showed higher rates of communicable and non-communicable diseases. 78.7% reported osteomuscular disorders, 28.6% reported arbovirus, and 68.7% reported accidents on the job with 89% of those accidents involving sharp objects. The mean average time spent working at that dump was 15 years.

In a cross-sectional study from 2010 to 2011 examined prevalence of hepatitis B surface antigens and antibodies as evidence of past HBV infection. Results show that HBV infections were found to be 2.4 times higher among recyclable waste collectors than in a population-based study of the same region.

Waste pickers report high contact exposure rates to human fecal matter and inconsistent glove use. Almost all of the 431 waste pickers tested, 99.5% of them tested positive for anti-HAV antibodies, indicating past exposure in nearly every waste picker tested.

Academic authors highlight the need for increased workers protection for waste pickers, arguing that the lack of institutional support leaves their work less safe and effective.

=== Waste picker organizations and Cooperative networks ===
Informal working conditions for waste pickers and the 1,829 WPOs existing in Brazil have internal problems holding them back. CNs uphold the individual action of the WPOs. After the Movimento Nacional de Catadores (National Waste Pickers' Movement), in 2006 enacted a law which would keep the waste pickers exempt from public bidding. In 2010, Brazil enacted the National Policy on Solid Waste (PNRS in Portuguese). This law provided regulation on post-use waste management and supported the expansion of waste picker organizations.

When properly organized, WPOs can significantly contribute to GHG emissions and energy savings. In 2023, about 30% of waste pickers were organized in Brazil. In a case study involving three different WPOs in Federal District (DF), found that when working together, CO2 emissions by 59% to 62% in one year.

According to research conducted by Abrelpe in 2019, recyclable materials that go into landfill improperly resulted in a loss of R$14 billion reais annually. This loss could have been allocated to waste pickers who earn a living collecting recyclables.

A national program, named Integrated Solid Waste and Carbon Finance Project, is developing strategies for incorporating waste pickers into local waste management systems. Organizing waste picking activities into recycling cooperatives has been one of CEMPRE's main activities as well.

== Regional disparities ==
Most of the recycling happens in the South and Southeast regions of Brazil. This is due to the centralized wealthier regions having increased access to recycling infrastructure and services. The South and Southeast regions account for over 85% of municipalities that have recycling services in Brazil. Compared to the North and Northeast which only have around 8.5% of the total number of municipalities with recycling services.

Florianopolis, an island in southern Brazil, is named as a national benchmark for compliance with environmental legislation. They have reverse logistics (take-back) systems that work well for their local circular economy.
