= Sound Material-Cycle Society =

Sound Material-Cycle Society is the term used in Japan to represent a similar concept of circular economy, especially since 2000 when Japan enforced Basic Act on Establishing a Sound Material-Cycle Society.

== Outline ==
In Japan, a similar concept of circular economy discussed mainly in 1990s. According to Hashimoto et al., various concepts were advocated. Some advocators addressed material cycles in an economic society only, some addressed to natural cycles as well, and some paid attention to virtuous cycles of the environment and economy, and cycles of relationships and lives.

In 2000, the Basic Act was established. Since then, disputes over the concept and definition of sound material-cycle society have been fewer.

The Ministry of the Environment, Japan publishes a white paper on the Sound Material-Cycle Society to report recent progresses toward the Sound Material-Cycle Society annually. English version are available for before 2010. The Japanese government has put forward Fundamental Plans since 2003 every five years or so in accordance with Article 15 of the Basic Act. The first plan set numerical targets of three national material flows, including resource productivity. The latest fourth plan was published in 2018 to advance the Japan's policy and actions further. Industry sectors are also attempting their actions toward the Sound Material-Cycle Society. The Japan Business Federation (known as "Keidanren" in Japanese), is the most well-known business federation in Japan, put forward their voluntary action plan for several years.

== Legal definition ==
Article 2 of the Basic Act define "Sound Material-Cycle Society" as a society in which the consumption of natural resources will be conserved and the environmental load will be reduced to the greatest extent possible, by preventing or reducing the generation of wastes, etc. from products, etc., by promoting proper cyclical use of products, etc. when these products, etc. have become circulative resources, and by ensuring proper disposal of circulative resources not put into cyclical use (i.e., disposal as wastes).

== See also ==
- Recycling in Japan
