= Waste management in Japan =

Waste management history and processes

Waste management in Japan has been influenced by its history, particularly periods of significant economic expansion, as well as its geography as a mountainous country with limited space for landfills. Important forms of waste disposal include incineration, recycling and, to a smaller extent, landfills and land reclamation. Although Japan has made progress since the 1990s in reducing waste produced and encouraging recycling, there is still further progress to be made in reducing reliance on incinerators and the garbage sent to landfills. Challenges also exist in the processing of electronic waste and debris left after natural disasters.

== History ==
There was no centralized systems or legislation for managing waste at the beginning of the Meiji Era. In 1900, two measures were introduced to improve sanitation and avoid epidemics which were being caused by waste accumulating on open land. The Sewage Disposal Law, Japan's first law on waste, along with the Waste Cleaning Act tried to establish administrative systems to handle waste and made municipalities responsible for disposal, through incineration if possible.

In the post-war period, from 1945, waste accumulated as the economy developed and people concentrated in urban areas. Manual collection was inefficient and administration was decentralized and unorganized. The Public Cleansing Law of 1954 required national and prefectural governments to provide financial and technological support to municipalities in their collection of waste. Then, in 1963, the Act on Emergency Measures concerning the Development of Living Environment Facilities established the development of waste management facilities, including incinerators. Subsidies were provided for incinerators, and the first incinerator to run around the clock was established that same year.

In 1955, the economy started growing at a significant rate. Changes in consumer culture caused more generation of household waste, but this was small compared to the increase in the volume of industrial waste, which was often improperly treated or disposed of. Examples included oil or chemical runoff into bodies of water, air pollution, and construction debris. Waste management and environmental protection came into national attention in the 1960s with the widespread recognition of the Four Big Pollution Diseases of Japan, in which chemicals discharged from factories into the environment caused debilitating illnesses for people exposed to them.

The National Diet session of 1970, referred to as the "Pollution Diet," sought to address these mounting issues of pollution and did so decisively, passing fourteen laws at once in what is seen as a turning point in environmental policy. These laws included policies to prevent pollution and established the Environmental Agency in 1971, which became the modern Ministry of the Environment. The 1952 Public Cleaning Law was revised significantly into the Waste Management and Public Cleansing Law, or Waste Management Law. This made environmental preservation a goal of waste treatment, instead of just public sanitation, set standards for waste treatment, and offered subsidies for the development of facilities to meet these standards. Overall, the legislation from this session moved Japan from having one of the least strict environmental regulation regimes among countries in the OECD to one of the most strict.

In the 1990s, the goal of reducing waste produced began to receive attention. In 1991, the Waste Management Law was again revised to add generation reduction as a national objective. Legislation that followed sought to reduce waste produced during manufacturing and promote recycling. In 2000, the Basic Act for Establishing a Sound Material-Cycle Society or Basic Recycling Act was established, which laid out a framework that emphasized reduction in waste generation and recycling, and set numerical targets to measure progress.

== Garbage collection ==
In Japan, public trash cans are quite rare, having been removed from public spaces in the aftermath of the 1995 Tokyo Subway Sarin Attack. Usually, trash produced outside is brought home and sorted with household trash before collection. Trash is sorted based on regulations that vary by municipality into as many as thirty different categories.

Sanitation workers in Japan load household garbage into a garbage truck.

In urban areas, garbage collection is usually done by small compacting garbage trucks which convey garbage from producers and bring it to centralized transport stations, where it is then delivered by a larger truck to a disposal or incineration site. This approach is used to minimize redundant trips and because smaller trucks can better navigate narrow urban roads. One area of innovation is the development of hybrid or electric motor trucks which produce less pollution and greenhouse gas emissions. In the collection business, there has been a recent trend towards privatization, with 80% of collection across Japan being done by private companies amidst public-sector cutbacks. In rural Japan, where there is no curbside collection, residents bring their own trash to neighborhood collection centers.

== Waste disposal ==
In 2014, 437 million tons of waste was produced in Japan, of which 44 million tons, or about 10%, was municipal waste and the remaining 393 million tons was industrial waste. (Note: This figure and others from this source do not directly correspond to the weight of unusable materials. For example, of this total, 36.2% is classified as having been disposed of through "dewater, thickening, and drying", which refers to evaporation of sludge waste, which is mostly water by weight. This figure is not reported in data for some European countries, making a direct comparison of disposal methods difficult.) In 2016, the 43 million tons of municipal waste was generated, about 925 grams per day for each person living in Japan. This continued a downward trend in both the total amount of household garbage produced and per-capita production that has been visible following recycling laws passed in the 1990s. Major disposal methods for waste in Japan include incineration, recycling, landfill and backfilling.

=== Incineration ===
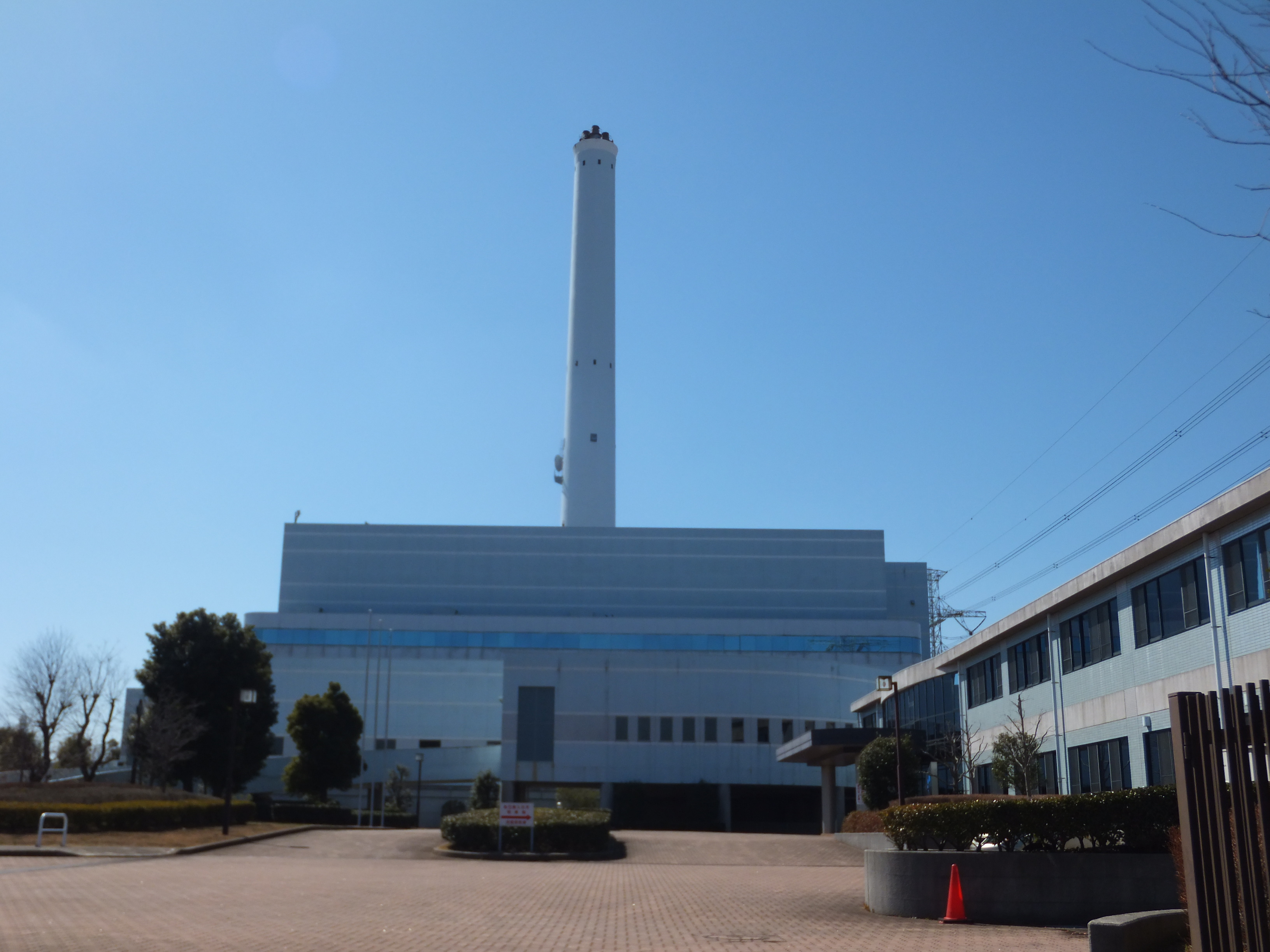
An incinerator facility in Chiba, Japan.

Incineration is the most widely used waste disposal method in Japan, and is attractive because of its ability to reduce the volume of trash in a country mostly occupied by mountains or people. In 2017, there were about 1,200 incineration facilities in Japan. In 2014, 358 of these plants also generated electricity. It is therefore important to note that in Japan, incineration and thermal recycling or energy recovery, where the garbage burned produces energy, are not synonymous.

In Tokyo, a typical incinerator can handle 600 tons of garbage a day, which is the waste produced by about 600,000 people. Incineration is done at a high temperature, and the exhaust gas is put through many stages of cleaning and monitoring to ensure hazardous materials like dioxin and mercury are removed and not released into the air. One waste product of incineration is ash, which has about 10% of the weight of the original garbage burned. This ash can be disposed of in landfills or used as raw material in industrial process.

=== Recycling ===
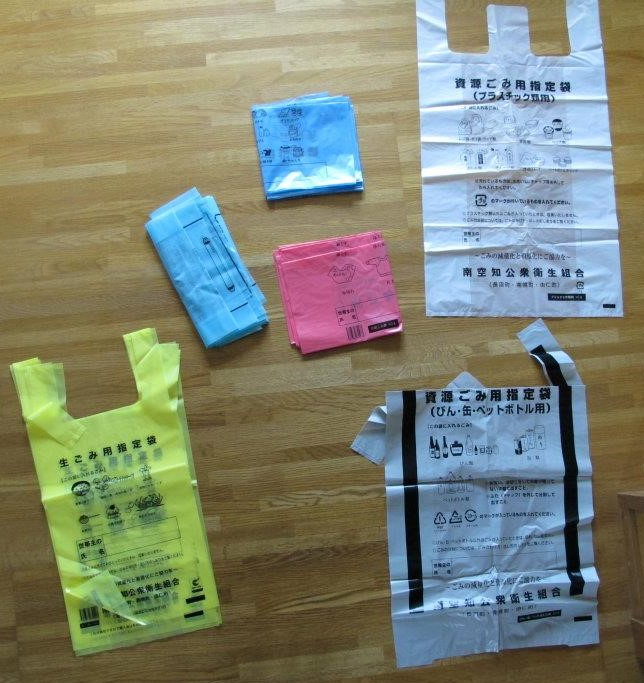
A variety of bags are used by households to recycle waste made from different materials

Recycling has been an increasing emphasis for waste disposal in Japan since recycling acts were passed in the 1990s. In 2014, the Resource Recycle Rate, the ratio of total material inputs into the economy and the amount recycled into raw inputs was 15.8%. In contrast, this figure was 8.2% in 1994.

Different categories of recyclable items can be evaluated individually. Japan is one of the top aluminum beverage cans recycling countries in the world, with a ratio of 84.7% recycled in 2014. Steel cans are also recycled at a higher rate in Japan, 92.9% in 2013, than anywhere else in the world. The plastic recycling picture is a bit more complicated. The government reports an 84% recycling rate, one of the highest in the world, but this includes thermal recycling, where plastic is burned for energy. Only 27% of collected plastic is reprocessed into usable material. Thermal recycling is criticized as not being true recycling, as it still encourages the use of single-use plastics and produces greenhouse gases.

There also exists legislation and systems established for the recycling of many specific types of less common waste, including for construction waste, appliances, vehicles, and electronics.

=== Landfill ===
In 2018, there were over 1,600 landfills across the country for disposing of nonburnable garbage and ash remaining from the incineration process. In this year, existing landfill space was expected to last another twenty years, though certain regions, unable to find enough space locally, had to ship garbage to other landfills in Japan for disposal. In 2014, 15 million tons of garbage were sent to landfills.

=== Backfilling ===
Backfilling or land reclamation is the process of filling in the sea with processed trash to create land that can be developed. In Tokyo, this has taken place since the 1920s and continues today. One contemporary example is the Central Breakwater, an artificial island in Tokyo Bay. In 2014, 21 million tons of garbage were put towards this purpose.

== Managing unconventional waste ==
=== Electronic waste ===
Electronic waste disposal and recycling is an important consideration for Japan, which produced 2.2 million tons of it in 2014, ranking third in volume behind the United States and China. In the 1990s, larger appliances and an increase in their numbers strained waste treatment facilities that were not able to adequately store them safely or extract valuable materials from them. This led to the Home Appliance Recycling Law in 2001, in which consumers and businesses are responsible for returning their used electronics and paying a fee to the producer, who in turn arranges for proper disposal. This implements a principle called the Extended Producer Responsibility. It is estimated that 50% to 66% of targeted appliances are properly recycled in this way, with a third being illegally exported overseas to be scrapped, and less than 1% illegally dumped.

=== Disaster debris ===
Japan has been beset by significant natural disasters in the past, and the debris resulting from this type of destruction poses unique challenges for waste management. Various forms of debris are scattered around a large area and mixed together while significant volumes flow out to sea. One notable case study is waste management in the aftermath of the 2011 Tōhoku earthquake and tsunami. Before the disaster, Sendai, the largest city in the area that was heaviest hit, had prepared a plan involving removal of disaster waste from the area in one year and disposal within three years. The plan detailed contingencies to quickly restart essential waste services to maintain hygienic conditions, ensure transportation could be conducted smoothly and safely, and even included considerations to use local businesses in rebuilding efforts where possible. Smaller municipalities had varying waste disposal challenges depending on their local economy, and received technical assistance from prefectural officials. Other municipalities such as Tokyo also assisted by accepting disaster debris for local treatment and disposal, though there were some concerns over radioactive contamination of the waste from the Fukushima Daiichi nuclear disaster.

== Legal framework ==
The 1993 Basic Environmental Act provides the backbone of Japan's environmental policy. Within this, the 2000 Basic Act for Establishing a Sound Material-Cycle Society or Basic Recycling Act lays out a framework for principles of waste management, including reducing resource consumption, as well as the general responsibilities of national and local governments, businesses, and citizens.

Concrete regulations and systems for waste management are established by the Waste Management Act, originally enacted in 1970 and revised in 2006. This lays out controls and regulations on generation and proper treatment of waste. The 1991 Effective Resource Utilization Promotion Act, revised in 2001 promotes recycling through encouraging the use of recyclable materials and provides for labeling at waste collection locations. A series (Note: Sector-specific recycling promotion acts include the Containers and Packaging Recycling Act, Home Appliance Recycling Act, Food Recycling Act, Construction Recycling Act Automobile Recycling Act, Small Home Appliance Recycling Act) of acts promote recycling in specific industries. Finally, a 2000 Green Purchasing Act encourages purchase of environmentally friendly products by national and local governments.

These acts have the effect of dividing up responsibility between the government at the national, prefectural and municipal levels, as well as waste-generating businesses and consumers. The national government implements standards, collects information, and provides technological support for lower levels of government. The prefectural government formulates plans and provides supervision of proper waste management. Ultimately, municipalities are responsible for constructing and maintaining waste management facilities. Construction is usually financed with the help of grants from the national government. In one example Japanese city, Kawasaki, Kanagawa, 3.6% of the general city budget went towards waste-related expenses.
