= Electronic waste in the United States =

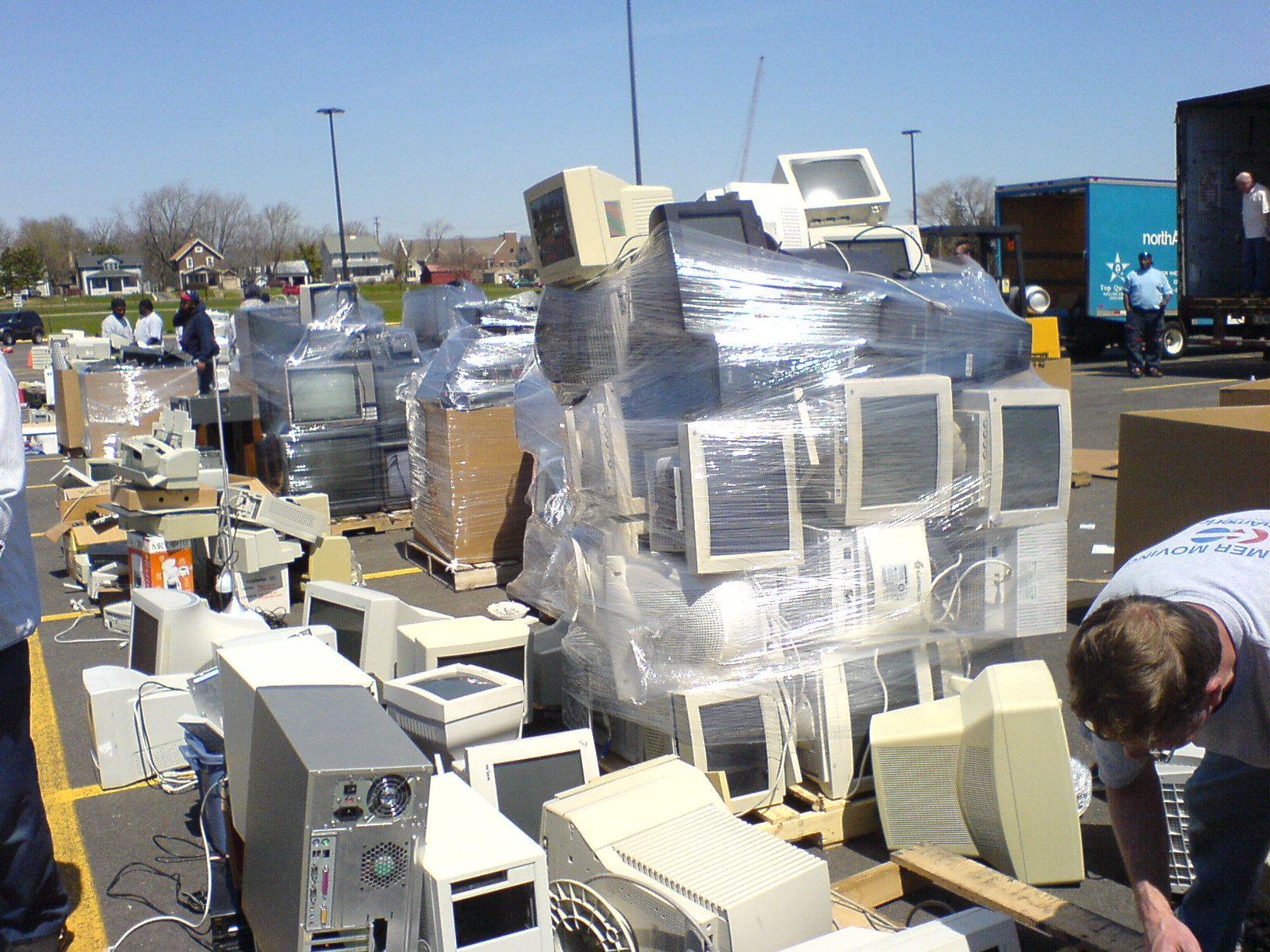
Cathode ray tube monitors being packed for shipping at a recycling event in Ann Arbor, Michigan

Electronic waste or e-waste in the United States refers to electronic products that have reached the end of their operable lives, and the United States is beginning to address its waste problems with regulations at a state and federal level. Used electronics are the quickest-growing source of waste and can have serious health impacts. The United States is the world leader in producing the most e-waste, followed closely by China; both countries domestically recycle and export e-waste. Only recently has the United States begun to make an effort to start regulating where e-waste goes and how it is disposed of. There is also an economic factor that has an effect on where and how e-waste is disposed of. Electronics are the primary users of precious and special metals, retrieving those metals from electronics can be viewed as important as raw metals may become more scarce

The United States does not have an official federal e-waste regulation system, yet certain states have implemented state regulatory systems. The National Strategy for Electronic Stewardship was co-founded by the Environmental Protection Agency (EPA), the Council on Environmental Quality (CEQ), and the General Services Administration (GSA), and was introduced in 2011 to focus on federal action to establish electronic stewardship in the United States. E-waste management is critical due to the toxic chemicals present in electronic devices. According to the United States EPA, toxic substances such as lead, mercury, arsenic, and cadmium are often released into the environment and endanger whole communities; these toxic contaminants can have detrimental effects on the health of ecosystems and living organisms. United States e-waste management includes recycling and reuse programs, domestic landfill dumping, and international shipments of domestically produced e-waste. The EPA estimates that in 2009, the United States disposed of 2.37 million tons of e-waste, 25% of which was recycled domestically.

Lack of awareness for e-waste issues is also a problem in the U.S., especially among young people. In a 2020 survey of people between the ages of 18 and 38, 60% did not know what the term "e-waste" is, and 57% did not consider electronic waste to be "a significant contributor to toxic waste." With electronic recycling options readily available in most states, the issue seems to be awareness, not availability. In 2018, an association of European electronic recyclers based in Brussels called the WEEE Forum, created International E-Waste Day on October 13, with the support of 19 e-waste companies globally, in order to raise awareness about how large of an issue e-waste has become.

== History of regulation ==
Up until 1965, there was no federal legislation regulating the disposal of solid and hazardous waste in the United States. The Solid Waste Disposal Act (SWDA) was passed by Congress in 1965. A major amendment to SWDA was the Resource Conservation and Recovery Act (RCRA), passed by Congress in 1976. The RCRA gives the EPA the ability to regulate the flow of hazardous waste for the entire lifetime of the product, including development, transport, and disposal. In 1986, a cargo vessel carrying 14,000 tons of toxic waste left Philadelphia and traveled around the world for more than five months continually being turned away from areas where it attempted to dump its contents. Eventually, much of the toxic waste was dumped into the Indian Ocean. This event sparked some of the current efforts to regulate the flows of electronic waste and ensure the health and safety of the global environment.

The U.S. has not enacted a federal law to regulate the domestic recycling of e-waste, but, some states are implementing policies to address its increasing accumulation. When electronic products stop functioning, they are either incinerated, landfilled, or recycled to salvage materials and protect public health and the environment by removing its toxic materials. Despite attempts to push federal e-waste bills forward, which stem as far back as the 1990s, US states have held the most legislative agency on e-waste. So far, 25 states have enacted legislation to regulate statewide e-waste recycling initiatives, which means 65% of the population must uphold their state's e-waste recycling policies. Every state with e-waste regulation laws, except Utah and California, use the Producer Responsibility approach to hold manufacturers accountable by making them fund e-waste recycling. But, because state e-waste laws vary, the effectiveness of the laws in regulating environmental and health harms can differ. Because the US has not ratified the Basel Convention on hazardous waste, the US can export e-waste to countries where the dismantling and recycling of e-waste are cheaper due to lax environmental and workplace regulations.

== Environmental and health effects ==
Because the US does not have federal or intergovernmental e-waste policies and electronics producers still manufacture products with hazardous materials, e-waste is oftentimes dismantled without strict regulations or compliance so substances like heavy metals, flame retardants, and plastics produce public health risks. Due to the unregulated nature of the informal recycling sector in developing countries, US e-waste handlers are exporting resources which could have detrimental effects on not only humans handling the e-waste, but also the environment in areas where the e-waste is exported.

=== Hazardous materials in electronic devices ===
Electronic devices are combinations of hundreds of different types of materials; many of them are considered to be toxic when exposed to humans. Although present within the device, these toxic heavy metals have only been documented to become a health hazard once the device is broken down. The process of electrical device breakdown occurs in a variety of locations and settings (recycling sites, storage locations), yet becomes a prominent health hazard when broken down in domestic or international sites that do not have the correct equipment or recycling methods. When taken apart without proper recycling methods, tools, or protective wear, workers and residents become exposed to the toxic chemicals in the devices. E-waste negatively impacts health primarily through the exposure of heavy metal dioxins. Incinerating e-waste without proper workplace and environmental regulations poses a risk because it generates dioxins, which can cause cancer and plague the human body and environment for long periods of time. Moreover, open burning, a common practice in developing countries receiving e-waste, releases toxic fumes and dust that can be easily inhaled and effect nearby food sources and water bodies. In addition to direct exposure through open burning and dismantling, e-waste storages and landfills can result in leakage of dioxins into the natural surroundings area. These dioxins are able to permeate the soil and contaminate ground water and nearby vegetation; not only does ecological contamination negatively affect overall ecosystem function, but it is another method in which all living organisms' health risks increase dramatically.

A few of these chemicals include:

- Flame retardants: Some flame retardants like Brominated Flame Retardants (BFRs), which can be found in e-waste plastic to make electronic products more flame resistant, are emitted into the environment through e-waste dismantling and become dust and air. BFRs are one of the materials that are used in the making of circuit boards and plastic casings. BFRs, which are fat-soluble, and bioaccumulate causing short-term effects, such as seizures and mountain sickness, and long-term effects, such as neurological disorders and endocrine disruption. PBDEs (polybrominated diphenyl ethers), a class of BFRs, interfere with brain development of animals and in the hormones associated with sexual development. Specifically, birds near processing sites who often carry these compounds in their shell. Long Term exposure to this toxin can result in problems concerning learning capability and memory function. Because of their toxicity, electronic manufacturers are phasing out BFRs.
- Lead: One can be exposed to lead through inhalation, ingestion, and skin contact, which could produce short-term effects, such as nausea, vomiting, convulsions, coma, or even death, and long-term effects, such as anemia, abdominal pain, encephalopathy, and nephropathy. Metallic lead exists in the electrical circuit boards and lead oxide is a component of the cathode ray tubes (CRTs) and is used to connect the glass face plate with funnel sections. Lead can be found in lead-acid batteries, solders, and in televisions and monitors. Lead can leach from CRTs in landfill conditions, be released into the air through incineration, glass crushing, or high-temperature processing. Similar to other toxins, lead can accumulate in the human body and biomass over a long period of time and can have damaging impacts on the nervous, respiratory, and cardiovascular systems. Lead is found in such high quantities of electronic waste that in the United States, prison recycling programs were found to have 50 times the safe level set by the EPA. Also, in China, children living near electronic waste processing sites are recorded to have 3 times the safe level of lead in their blood.
- Cadmium: Cadmium is another metal, which is found in rechargeable batteries and "phosphor" coatings in older cathode ray tubes (CRTs). Cadmium compounds are used in a variety of electronic products, their functions ranging from stabilizing PVC formations to serving as wire insulators. Cadmium is a rare metal that is very toxic to plants, animals, and humans and is released into the air by incineration or poorly executed dismantling. When released, cadmium commonly accumulates in nearby crops, resulting in additional exposure to humans and animals. Occupationally, fumes and dust containing cadmium compounds, a known carcinogen, can be inhaled directly, and long-term exposure results in kidney failure and bone problems. Heart disease, hypertension, and lung cancer are other health effects of cadmium inhalation. Cadmium exposure can lead to developmental issues involving motor skills, cognition, and learning. It can also potentially cause harm to kidneys.
- Mercury: Mercury is primarily utilized in the lighting mechanisms for flat-screen devices. Mercury is a highly toxic chemical that can have fatal or severely damaging effects on the human central nervous system, especially during early development ages. As one of the most toxic and popular metals used in electronic products, mercury is an e-waste pollutant that can affect humans through inhalation and skin contact. It is known to cause short-term effects, such as vomiting, fever, and diarrhea, and in the long-term, can cause tremors, nausea, neuroasthenia, and hypersensitivity. Because of its widespread application, mercury can be found in common household products like batteries, fluorescent lamps, and thermostats.

=== Domestic effects ===
One end-of-life treatment for electronic products is landfilling. In the US, some states have implemented landfill bans to accompany e-waste laws to reach collection goals and ensure e-waste is funneled through the proper channels. The danger in landfilling e-waste is that hazardous materials can leach out into groundwater or run off and pollute nearby water bodies. To address this, the US e-waste recycling industry is growing and continuing to implement robust workplace and environmental standards. In 2011, US e-waste recycling added an estimated $20.6 billion to the US economy and created roughly 45,000 jobs. Still, e-waste, that contain toxic materials like lead and cadmium, can pose risks for US e-waste workers when processed manually. For instance, when processing cathode ray tubes (CRTs), which are found in television and computer monitors, workers use handheld tools like hammers that expose them to hazardous materials. As a result, the Center for Disease Control (CDC) and National Institute for Occupational Safety and Health (NIOSH) investigate e-waste recycling facilities for health and environmental compliance. At e-waste recycling facilities, manually dismantling and sorting e-waste is the most popular technique, and shredding or other automated separation techniques are secondary. One risk associated with manual dismantling is the potential for lead and cadmium contamination. Lead can disperse throughout e-waste recycling facilities covering surfaces, worker's uniforms, and areas outside the production floor, which can result in ingestion or inhalation of lead. Because of this, federal regulatory bodies like the Occupational Safety and Health Administration (OSHA) state that e-waste recycling facilities must provide uniforms, showers, and laundry services for workers. When facilities don't meet these protocols, lead and cadmium exposures can leave the production floor with workers and enter their personal vehicles or homes, which can adversely affect the health of family members.

Federal Prison Industries (FPI), also known as UNICOR, a government corporation that employs federal prison inmates, started an electronic-waste recycling program in 1994. UNICOR, a large government contractor, produced over $765 million in sales in 2005 and has accepted contracts for recycling e-waste since 1997. UNICOR has developed e-waste recycling operations in 10 federal prisons. In addition, in 2009, UNICOR had 1,000 incarcerated individuals processing about 40 million pounds of e-waste. Since its inception, the e-waste recycling program has faced scrutiny regarding its lax safety enforcement, and has been subject to multiple health and safety investigations. Additionally, prisoners participating in this program are not protected under the Fair Labor Standards Act, and since they are not considered employees, they cannot formally organize and are not protected to speak out about unsafe working conditions. This lack of legal protection leads workers to continue to operate in unsafe conditions, with fears of being fired or sent to another prison. In addition, OSHA is not permitted to conduct surprise inspections, which undermines their ability to investigate workplace safety violations. The UNICOR facility in Atwater was shut down in 2002 after an air quality test found lead and cadmium levels exceeding the standards set by OSHA. Between 2002 and 2005, a series of renovations and safety measures were taken to comply with safety standards, but the effectiveness of these efforts in reducing worker exposure to toxicants was debated. In 2010, a report from the Inspector General revealed that UNICOR was in violation of e-waste recycling standards. The report found that UNICOR failed to provide protective workplace equipment or proper tools to dismantle electronic products, which resulted in staff and incarcerated individuals being exposed to lead and cadmium above permissible levels. Moreover, unspecified amounts of e-waste processed by UNICOR were also shipped overseas. Additionally, illegal storage and disposal of toxic waste, such as glass and electronic dust debris by UNICOR facilities, can lead to contaminated soil, air and water from wind and rainwater runoff. Health and safety negligence within the prison e-waste program may contribute to the accumulation of toxics in surrounding communities that are often made up of predominately low-income and minority residents.

=== Global effects ===
Anywhere from 50 to 70% of e-waste collected in the US for recycling is exported to developing countries, which commonly ends up in the informal recycling sectors of Asia and West Africa. China receives the largest e-recycling volume, followed by India, Nigeria, and Ghana. Burning and dismantling e-waste is a main driver of atmospheric pollution and along with manual disassembly, is the primary workplace practice that results in exposure to hazardous materials. Oftentimes workers don't have the workplace protective equipment, like uniforms and face masks, necessary to shield them from the toxic fumes and dust. As the e-waste export chain generally ends in rural, unregulated, and technically illegal burning or dismantling sites, the workers are often subjected to extremely poor and hazardous conditions and are unable to unionize or speak out for better rights. High poverty levels correlate with illegal e-waste dumping sites, which is why most e-waste workers don't have the option to speak out and lose business or their jobs. In rural areas, contaminating compounds can accumulate in agricultural areas and be taken in by grazing animals. As the chemicals in question generally have a slow metabolic rate in animals, the compounds have a tendency to bioaccumulate in tissues and further contaminate humans through eggs, milk, and other edible products. In addition to human health hazards, contamination of water and soil can kill off entire populations, thus harming or destroying the local ecosystem. United States e-waste is primarily shipped to the following areas:

China: In China, a variety of simple and complex e-waste disposal and disassembly processes take place. E-waste management practices include melting printed circuit boards to recover solder (surrounding plastics are burned off in the process), manual disassembly, and the use of acid to extract metals from complex mixtures. Due to the rudimentary methods of disposal and the number of years of e-waste processing, rural areas in China are beginning to experience contaminated surface water and soil that can hinder communities from further living on the land. In the case of Guiyu China, the region with the world's highest levels of cancer-causing dioxins, discharge water runs off into Lianjiang River. The Lianjiang River is considered to be a category 5 river; meaning that according to the Chinese Ministry of Environmental Protection, the water quality is not safe for human consumption or agricultural function and use. Some open air workshops in China use acid to recover valuable materials from e-waste and wastewater is transported to drainage pits, which can run off into other water bodies and severely impact freshwater ecosystems and impact agricultural sources. In some cases, groundwater is contaminated from the acids of shredding and separating workshops. In Guiyu, 80% of the children suffer from respiratory diseases because children typically work in or live near waste disposal sites. Children in China also can experience elevated blood levels, skin damage, headaches, chronic gastritis, and duodenal ulcers due to e-waste recycling pollutants. In Guiyu China, e-waste workers adhere to the industry despite risks, as can make an equivalent of $600 a month, which pays more than other occupations.

Africa: Certain African countries where U.S. e-waste is shipped to, are known for the use of child labour at e-waste dismantling sites. In Ghana at the Agbogbloshie e-waste site, the employment of children of ages 5–18 has been documented. Young girls between the ages of 9-12 have been reported to primarily work as collectors and vendors, while the other children directly assist in burning and dismantling processes. The UN's "Solving the E-Waste Problem" initiative, which was set up in 2007 to tackle the world's growing crisis of electronic waste, warned that the global volume of electronic waste refuse is set to grow by 33% over the next four years. Much of it will be dumped in sites such as those in Agbogbloshie, increasing the risk of land contamination with lead, mercury, cadmium, arsenic and flame retardants. Currently several organizations are working towards creating better conditions to handle e-waste. These organizations include Global Alliance for Health and Pollution GAHP; Green Advocacy Ghana, an environmental NGO based in Ghana, West Africa that aims at upholding and enhancing the sustainability and integrity of Ghana's environment, and Pure Earth.

Latin America: Similar to Africa, Latin American countries associated with U.S. e-waste export contain child labor at management sites. In Nicaragua in particular, studies have documented that children working at the sites have highly elevated levels of PBDE in the children's serum. The reports document, however, that low-income communities that surround (but not work at) the site, have similar raised levels of PBDE and heavy metal dioxins. Malnourishment is common in children in these surrounding areas, and increases children's susceptibility of developing fatal diseases from exposure to these chemicals. E-waste management is slowly been taken into the political agenda of some countries in Latin America. However, in most countries the present destinies of obsolete electrical and electronic equipment as well as quantitative figures are unknown. Only Mexico, Costa Rica, Colombia, Peru, Argentina and Chile have particular baseline studies available so far. Specific e-waste legislation is in development in Costa Rica. All other countries of Latin America still lag behind in drafting a legal framework for e-waste management. While drafting such legislation the roles of both government and industry need to be clarified. Traditional models for solid waste management have assigned the tasks of collection and disposal of waste to public authorities; however, an EPR model requires an adequate assignation and re partition of responsibilities along the reverse supply chain. A participatory process in designing the legal framework is therefore a prerequisite of a successful later implementation.

India: In India, over 1 million urban poor workers, often with low literacy skills and awareness of the potential hazards of e-waste exposure, manually dismantle e-waste. A great portion of Indian e-waste workers are children and women. High levels of dioxin compounds, which are linked to cancer and developmental defects, have been commonly found in the breast milk and placentas of women exposed to e-waste, which can reveal improper disposal and handling of electronic products. Specifically, there are various reports that the city of Delhi contains several e-waste management sites that use concentrated hydrochloric and nitric acids to extract gold and copper. Recycling of e-waste is a very lucrative business in India and dominated by informal actors. E-waste in India is often processed to recover valuable materials in small workshops using rudimentary recycling methods. For instance, during the manual dismantling process in informal dismantling and recycling sites, e-waste recyclers use chisels, hammers, and cutting torches to open solder connections and separate various types of metals and components. Researchers have collected ashes from two waste burning operations in New Delhi, India, at Ibrahimpur and Shashtri Park which contained high levels of cadmium, copper, lead, and zinc.

Thailand: In Thailand, e-waste can also lead to human health risks, such as cancer and human developmental difficulties, if it is not properly disposed of. Also, the incinerators they use to burn e-waste can cause headaches, coughing, and nausea.

== United States legislation ==
=== Federal ===
The United States Congress considers a number of electronic waste bills, including the National Computer Recycling Act introduced by Congressman Mike Thompson (D-CA). Meanwhile, the main federal law governing solid waste is the Resource Conservation and Recovery Act of 1976. It covers only CRTs, though state regulations may differ. There are also separate laws concerning battery disposal. Several trade organizations including the Consumer Electronics Association are lobbying for the implementation of comprehensive federal laws. On March 25, 2009, the House Science and Technology Committee approved funding for research on reducing electronic waste and mitigating environmental impact, regarded by sponsor Ralph Hall (R-TX) as the first federal bill to address electronic waste directly. On July 6, 2009, Senator Amy Klobuchar (D-MN) and Senator Kirsten Gillibrand (D-NY) proposed the "Electronic Device Recycling Research and Development Act". Bill S.1397 not only focuses on stopping illegal e-waste dumping, but it also calls for sustainable design of electronic equipment as well as offers funding for research and development of more sustainable designs, which would reduce the amount of toxic waste and increase the reuse and recycling of electronic products.

During Earth Day, April 22, 2009, two bills were passed by the House of Representatives: H.R. 1580 Electronic Device Recycling Research and Development Act, introduced by Rep. Bart Gordon on March 18, 2009, and H.R. 957 Green Energy Education Act, introduced by Rep. Michael McCaul (R-TX.) H.R. 1580 requires the Administration of EPA to give merit-based grants to consortia of universities, government labs and private industries to conduct research with the purpose of finding new approaches to recycling and reduction of hazardous materials in electronic devices and to "contribute to the professional development of scientists, engineers, and technicians in the field of electronic device manufacturing, design, refurnishing, and recycling." The bill will require the recipients of the grants to report every two years to Congress about the progress of their research, gaps in the advancement, risks and regulatory barriers that might hinder their progress. The Congressional Budget Office estimates that to put the bill in effect "would cost $10 million in 2010 and $80 million over the 2010-2014 period." The other billed passed, H.R. 957, authorizes the Department of Energy in partnership with the National Science Foundation to provide grants to Institutions of higher education to promote education and training for Engineers and Architects "in high energy and high-performance building design."

=== State ===
A policy of "diversion from landfill" has driven legislation in many states requiring higher and higher volumes of electronic waste to be collected and processed separate from the solid waste stream.

In 2001, Arkansas enacted the Arkansas Computer and Electronic Solid Waste Management Act, which requires that state agencies manage and sell surplus computer equipment, establishes a computer and electronics recycling fund, and authorizes the Department of Environmental Quality to regulate and/or ban the disposal of computer and electronic equipment in Arkansas landfills.

California was the first state to legislate around the issue of e-waste. It implemented a broader waste ban, with advance recovery fee funding in 2003. Electronic waste in California may neither be disposed of in a landfill nor be exported overseas. The 2003 Electronic Waste Recycling Act in California introduced an Electronic Waste Recycling Fee on all new monitors and televisions sold to cover the cost of recycling. The fee ranges from six to ten dollars. California went from only a handful of recyclers to over 60 within the state and over 600 collection sites. The amount of the fee depends on the size of the monitor; it was adjusted on July 1, 2005, in order to match the real cost of recycling. Cellphones are "considered hazardous waste" in California; many chemicals in cellphones leach from landfills into the groundwater system. In 2016, California approved AB 1419, a bill that aims to recycle panel glass, which is used in different types of electronics, locally instead of shipping it to other countries for disposal.

Colorado legislation requires education programs that address its electronic waste problem.

In 2004, Maine passed Maine Public Law 661, An Act to Protect Public Health and the Environment by Providing for a System of Shared Responsibility for the Safe Collection and Recycling of Electronic Waste. It necessitates that after 2006, computer manufacturers take responsibility for handling and recycling computer monitors, and pay the handling costs as well.

Massachusetts was the first of the United States to make it illegal to dispose of CRTs in landfills in April 2000, most similar to the European disposal bans of the 1990s.

Minnesota enacted a law making vendors responsible for the disposal of their branded electronics. Minnesota legislation also outlaws the dumping of cathode ray tubes in landfills.

A law in the state of Washington took effect on January 1, 2009, requiring manufacturers of electronic goods to pay for recycling, and establishing a statewide network of collection points. The program, called E-Cycle Washington, is managed by the Department of Ecology and the Washington Materials Management & Financing Authority.

On January 28, 2010, Arizona introduced HB 2614, a producer responsibility law modeled on the Oregon law that would have covered computers, laptops and TV monitors for recycling. However, it was withdrawn on February 15, 2010.

As of 2008, 17 states have producer responsibility laws in some form. In all, 35 states have or are considering electronic waste recycling laws.

Location	Date signed into law	Legislation
Arkansas	2003	Arkansas Computer and Electronic Solid Waste Management Act
California	2003	California Electronic Waste Recycling Act; Cell Phone Takeback and Recycling; Rechargeable Battery Takeback and Recycling CRT Glass Recycling
Colorado	July 2007	National Computer Recycling Act; Cell Phone Takeback and Recycling; Rechargeable Battery Takeback and Recycling
Connecticut	July 2007	CT Electronic Recycling Law
Hawaii	July 2008	Hawaii Electronic Device Recycling Program
Illinois	September 2008	Electronic Products Recycling and Reuse Act
Indiana	May 2009	Amendment to Indiana environmental law
Maine	2004	§1610. Electronic waste An Act To Protect Public Health and the Environment by Providing for a System of Shared Responsibility for the Safe Collection and Recycling of Electronic Waste
Maryland	2005	Maryland's Statewide Electronics Recycling Program
Michigan	May 2007	SB No. 897
Minnesota	December 2008	Minnesota's Electronics Recycling Act
Missouri	June 2008	Manufacturer Responsibility and Consumer Convenience Equipment Collection and Recovery Act
New Jersey	December 2008	Act No. 394
New York State	28 May 2010	Electronic Equipment Recycling and Reuse Act (effective from 1 April 2011)
New York City	April 2008, vetoed overrode by council May 2008	INT 728; INT 729
North Carolina	August 2007 amended to add TVs; August 2008	S1492 (2007); H819 (2008 Amendment)
Oklahoma	May 2008	Oklahoma Computer Equipment Recovery Act
Oregon	June 2007	House Bill 2626
Pennsylvania	November 2010	PA Covered Device Recycling Act
Rhode Island	June 2008	Electronic Waste Prevention, Reuse, and Recycling Act
Texas	June 2007	House Bill 2714
Virginia	March 2008	Computer Recovery and Recycling Act.
Washington	March 2006	SB 6428
West Virginia	March 2008	SB 746
Wisconsin	October 2009	SB 107

== United States' export of e-waste ==
The United States, along with a number of economically developed countries, ships the majority of its e-waste across seas to economically developing countries. The United Nations estimates between 10% and 50% of US e-waste is exported, the EPA estimates 25%, and the International Trade Commission estimates that the number is closer to 13%. Despite the numerous reports existing that document the waste's movement and existence, there lacks a coherent presentation of the data; largely due to the difficulty of accessing this information. Studies indicate that this gap exists primarily because of: undifferentiated trade codes, inconsistent methods of marking and classifying electronic products, inconsistent records kept in waste destination countries, and a lack of pressure holding companies accountable. Shipment of e-waste is not a partisan issue since local governments and private industries collaborate to manage non-functioning electronics.

Research indicates that while mobile cell phones make up the overall greatest used electronics flows, TVs account for the largest flow of used electronics that are collected, and monitors have the highest export rates. The data records available show that the largest hubs for mobile phone deportation are Asia (Hong Kong, HKSAR) and the Caribbean and parts of Latin America (Guatemala, Paraguay, Panama, Peru, and Colombia). Larger electronics, such as TVs and monitors, have a higher likelihood of being exported to countries such as Mexico, Paraguay, Venezuela, and China. In addition to directly shipping waste overseas, many developed countries ship their e-waste to "transport sites", which then re-export the waste to surrounding countries or rural areas within their own country and make an extra profit. The largest international transit ports reside in Asia (Hong Kong, China, United Arab Emirates), which results in large quantities of waste ending up in smaller regions in the area. A prime example of this is the Chinese town of Guiyu, which has been denoted as the e-waste capital of the world.

=== Export results ===
TVs:

- Color TVs comprise the group with highest export rates.
- Higher transportation rates by vessel or over land rather than by air.

Mobile Phones:

- Largest export destinations: Latin America, Asia, South America.
- 73% of exports occur by air.

Computers:

- Split into two categories: Desktop and Laptop.
- Laptops have much higher export rates due to lower weight and higher re-use value.
- Largest export destinations include Asia and Europe.

Monitors:

- Split into two categories: CRT Monitors and Flat Panel Monitors.

=== Re-export destination flows: Transport Sites ===
Completely accurate data concerning E-waste export flows is difficult to acquire and accumulate. There is a difference between simply used electronics that are exported and re-used in different countries and used electronics that are broken down as waste, but the United States lacks reports distinguishing the two. Used electronic often are shipped to a hub, where they are exported to lower-income areas that break down the devices, thus exposing the community to toxins. According to the records that track the initial export of used electronics, the major re-export destination hubs are: Lebanon, Argentina, Hong Kong, United Arab Emirates, Chile, Mexico, and China.

=== International unregulated e-waste junkyards ===
E-waste is primarily shipped to large international hubs, such as Hong Kong. However, the majority of waste that is not recycled in those hubs is exported to rural areas where the waste is often improperly managed and becomes a severe contaminant. Unregulated junkyards and processing sites are unlicensed and almost always in violation of the law. This results in a lack of worker protection and rights, generally indicating a lack of awareness of the risks and hazards. Aside from general improper dismantling of the devices, open burnings and waste storage commonly take place.

==== Improper dismantling and processing ====
Unregulated e-waste processing junkyards do not contain proper equipment or employ safety precautions. The primary dismantling process generally includes manual separation of the plastic sections from the rest of the device; the plastic sections are then shredded into small portions if not re-usable themselves. If these plastic fragments are not directly resold to larger companies, they are further broken down into a fine powder. When this process is poorly regulated, the powder is easily inhaled and absorbed into the soil, air, and surrounding vegetation. The electronic devices are also stripped of their heavy metal components; this process in turn exposes workers to the raw elements of the metals. In addition to manually dismantling the devices, unregulated junkyards are ultimate disposal sites. Device disposal is mainly done by burning or smashing and burying the fragments; the aftermath of which has been documented to cause significant health problems in the surrounding area.

==== Open burning ====
Open burnings are the most common means of 'disposing of' e-waste and occur primarily in rural areas with low incomes of developing countries. Communities use open burning for a variety of functions: For direct disposal, it takes the least amount of man-power and is the cheapest option. For precious metal extraction, it can be an effective method to extract certain valuable metals, such as gold. The combustion of burning e-waste results in ash that contains fine particulate matter; a measure of pollutants that has been linked to cardiovascular and pulmonary issues. Additional health risks result from direct exposure to the toxic metals that release dioxins when burned and in addition to being inhaled, become embedded into the soil and plants in the surrounding area. The United Nations has done significant research into the growing issue of e-waste disposal and has documented that different communities are disproportionately affected by this issue: "Such practices are closely related to poverty because uncontrolled waste dumps typically are located close to human settlements. Since poor people neither have the economic means nor the technical knowledge, they also ignite their own wastes and thus create their own dioxin sources in their backyards. Therefore, women and children spending most time at home and living close to the burning areas are most exposed and at higher risk than others, e.g., urban and wealthier populations."

==== Waste storage for processing ====
In addition to open burning of electronic waste, rural communities are often used as storage locations. There exist varying stages in the life of an electronic device, and devices are stored or recycled depending on their specific stage. Storage facilities are almost always improperly constructed and regulated and thus generally result in the contamination of the soil and natural area surrounding the facility. Facilities that store cathode ray tubes (CRT) are particularly contaminated. Soil and dust samples collected at these locations indicate high levels of cadmium, zinc, and yttrium along with other heavy metal dioxins.

=== Export responsibility ===
While the number of e-Waste recycling programs in the United States has increased, a portion of the waste continues to be shipped overseas. Recent research done by the Basel Action Network indicates that along with companies directly attempting to ship their waste overseas or into domestic landfills, certain questionable recycling programs themselves have contributed to the export numbers. Questionable recycling companies act as brokers and "cut costs by offloading dismantling and recycling to impoverished countries with lax labor laws, weak environmental regulations, and poor human rights track records." Basel Action Network gained credibility after exposing electronic take-back programs that promoted their focus on sustainability by attaching tracking devices to the donated used electronic devices. About one third of the 200 geolocating tracking devices of BAN's primary investigation ended up overseas and finished their journey in rural Hong Kong.

Before any legislation regulating e-waste was enacted, companies could directly export their e-waste to recycling or landfill hubs. After regulation measures were introduced, the majority of exports are done through either certified e-waste handlers or uncertified handlers. The largest two competing certified handlers are e-stewards and Institute of Scrap Recycling Industries (ISRI). ISRI represents some of the largest waste handlers because they are in trade with Asia and Africa. Although many recycling programs have increased in efficiency, loopholes still exist within the recycling program that allow companies to continue to export parts of the used electronic devices. The majority of e-stewards recyclers implement no-export policies regarding the entire device, yet are still allowed to export raw plastics and metals in their simplest form. Due to this loophole, electronics are often labeled as raw plastics in order to pass customs, but in reality contain most of the components of the full electronic device; this nearly complete device then follows the general export process of being shipped and broken down at an e-waste hub, where the non-valuable components are then shipped to a junkyard to be broken down. Additionally, reports show that recyclers with e-steward certification are able to export used electronics if the devices have undergone a test that proves they can still function. These devices similarly make up the shipments made to hubs for the extraction of valuable parts.

== Regulation of e-waste ==
=== International regulation ===
The Basel Convention on the Control of Transboundary Movements of Hazardous Wastes and Their Disposal of 1989 is an international treaty that stipulates guidelines of hazardous waste movement. In 2006, members of the Basel Convention began to discuss the addition of electronic waste management. Though 185 states including the European Union have ratified the treaty, the United States, one of the largest exporters of electronic waste, has not ratified it. In terms of international regulatory bodies, in 2010 the United States EPA and United Nations University Solving the E-waste Problem Initiative (UNU-Step) began responding to the issue of electronic waste being exported to developing countries by tracking global flows of electronic waste. In addition, in 2011 the United States EPA, Taiwanese EPA, and other international governments collaborated to form the International E-Waste Management Network (IEMN) to outline best practices on global electronic waste management and highlight next steps.

In 2018, China issued the "National Sword" policy to regulate the number of recyclables that enter the country and prevent other countries from sending various solid waste materials, such as metals and plastics, into China. This has led countries to begin exporting their waste to other Asian countries, such as Vietnam and Thailand. Subsequently, these countries began to implement bans on waste as well. In Vietnam, they have decided to stop allowing countries to send waste and cut a significant amount of their importations, as of 2018. In terms of electronic waste specifically, Thailand ruled in this same year that they would stop taking electronic waste from other countries and in 2021, they would stop accepting plastics.

In 2021, China decided that they will not allow any type of solid waste into their country because of the overabundance of waste they've been receiving since the 1980s.

=== Domestic regulation ===
To address consumer and manufacturer desires to properly handle e-waste in the absence of federal legislation, two US recycling standards were put in place: the e-stewards Standard for Responsible Recycling and Reuse of Electronic Equipment and the Responsible Recycling Practices (R2). Certified e-waste recyclers must comply with outlined best practices for handling e-waste. R2 was released in 2008 and revised in 2013 and is thought of as more practical to implement while also being fully consistent with the Basel Convention because it was organized by the EPA and other e-waste stakeholders. E-stewards and R2 recyclers are regulated by different protocols. In the area of exporting e-waste to developing countries for repairs or recycling, R2 recyclers can still export while e-stewards recyclers are prohibited. In the area of incinerating or land-filling e-waste, R2 recyclers are able to put toxic e-waste in landfills or incinerators if undefined 'circumstances beyond their control' take place while e-stewards are prohibited. In regards to workplace safety, R2 recyclers are permitted to determine which chemicals are toxic and the appropriate levels of exposure while e-stewards must test practices for their hazards, like breaking CRTs, removing mercury-containing devices, shredding and using solvents or thermal processes to break down e-waste. Another consumer and public health issue is prison e-waste recycling. In this area, R2 recyclers may use prison recycling operations at their discretion while e-steward recyclers are banned from doing so. Currently, there are more than 600 certified R2 recyclers in about 21 countries. The Basel Action Network (BAN) was a participant in the EPA's R2 recycling certification but broke away within two-and-a-half years. Because of the less stringent regulations on R2 recyclers, the Basel Action Network formed the e-stewards recycling certification to generate more robust e-waste regulations. Though most companies choose R2 or e-stewards certification, some companies like Sims Recycling Solutions are certified by both.

==== Lobbying ====
Various organizations actively lobby government in order to address electronic waste issues. The major organizations are the Basel Action Network and the Silicon Valley Toxics Coalition.

In 2002, a small activist group in California called Silicon Valley Toxics Coalition (SVTC) began lobbying, consisting largely of employees from PC and printer producers, like Hewlett-Packard. The coalition lobbied state legislators for stricter e-waste regulation which played a large role in the passing of the California Electronic Waste Recycling Act. In 2010, Empire Government Strategies helped write New York's E-Waste law that requires New York electronic companies to lead free e-waste recycling initiatives. Electronic Recyclers International, a small business that recycles electronic waste, began lobbying for more effective policies to combat e-waste in 2012.

Since e-waste regulations began passing state by state, electronics manufacturers have both lobbied against e-waste regulations and been very cooperative with regulations once passed. In Washington, large companies fought against the passing of the 2006 Electronic Product Recycling Act. Yet since its passing, companies like Apple and Microsoft have instituted large scale takeback recycling initiatives, while also helping to fund the recycling and disposal of electronics.

== Consumer recycling and disposal ==
According to the EPA, consumers should dispose of electronics via recycling because,"Electronic products are made from valuable resources and materials, including metals, plastics, and glass, all of which require energy to mine and manufacture. Donating or recycling consumer electronics conserves our natural resources and avoids air and water pollution, as well as greenhouse gas emissions that are caused by manufacturing virgin materials." Consumer recycling options include donating equipment directly to organizations in need, sending devices directly back to their original manufacturers, or getting components to a convenient recycler or refurbisher.

However, recycling is not practical in all cases, and disposal is sometimes necessary.

=== Donation ===
The EPA maintains a list of electronic recycling and donation options for American consumers. The National Cristina Foundation, TechSoup (the Donate Hardware List), the Computer Takeback Campaign, and the National Technology Recycling Project provide resources for recycling. Local recycling sites that do not process waste products on site still contribute to electronic waste.

A key issue with the donation of electronic waste by consumers is convenience. Although there are state-by-state options, like ones listed above, a 2004 mail survey of California households found that a lack of nearby recycling options for e-waste was the number one reason for residents not recycling their e-waste. Pew Research Center survey information also found that in 2016, only approximately 48% of adult Americans said electronic waste was recycled in their community, in a sample size of 1,534 people over all 50 states.

=== Takeback ===
Corporations across the United States offer electronic takeback and recycling programs, offering low-cost to no-cost recycling. These centers accept and recycle electronics from the public, including mobile phones, laptop and desktop computers, digital cameras, and home and auto electronics. Companies such as Staples, Toshiba, and Gateway offer takeback programs that provide monetary incentives for recyclable or working technologies. The Manufacturers Recycling Management Co. was founded by Panasonic, Sharp Corporation, and Toshiba to manage electronic waste branded by these manufacturers, including 750 tons of TVs, computers, audio equipment, faxes, and components in its first four months. Office Depot lets customers obtain "tech recycling" boxes for e-waste if not eligible for the EcoNEW tech trade-in program. Best Buy offers a similar program for products purchased from Best Buy.

Though helpful to both the environment and its citizens, there are some downsides to such programs. Many corporations offer services for a variety of electronic items, while their recycling centers are few in number. Recycling centers and takeback programs are available in many parts of the country, but the type and amount of equipment to be recycled tends to be limited. Some corporations, like Sony in its Take Back Recycling Program, provide recycling incentives but only accept up to five recycled items per day and only if they are that corporation's products. Sony also partners with the Waste Management Inc. Recycle America program and offers discounts and tradeup programs. Costco, which offers free shipping and handling for all recycled pieces of equipment, will only allow Costco club members to participate in their programs. Crutchfield Electronics offers its own gift cards in exchange for electronic waste, through Consumer Electronics Exchange. Hewlett-Packard has recycled over 750 million pounds of electronic waste globally, including hardware and print cartridges.

=== Reuse ===
There are several organizations that implement reuse programs, such as Digitunity and the World Computer Exchange. Digitunity is a non-profit organization that aims to collect used devices to donate it to those in need. The World Computer Exchange accepts computer donations of electronics that they give to low-income communities worldwide.

Free Geek is a collectively run, non-profit organization based in Portland, Oregon. It aims to reuse or recycle used computer equipment that might otherwise become hazardous waste, and to make computer technology more accessible to those who lack financial means or technical knowledge. Also, New Neighborhood Development, Inc. is a recently started non-profit organization in Illinois, providing free electronic recycling to bring awareness to e-waste hazards.

TechForward, SellCell.com, Flipsy, Gazelle, NextWorth, and Trademore are examples of companies that had accepted or will accept trade-ins of used devices as well as resale to consumers.

=== A form of household hazardous waste ===
When feasible, e-waste should be recycled. But recycling such items is not always practical. When this happens, a household consumer should consider whether the e-waste is household hazardous waste, and if so (which it often is), take it to a proper place for disposal.

== See also ==
- Electronic waste by country
- Electronic Waste Recycling Fee - California
- Texas Campaign for the Environment
- Metech Incorporated
- Recycling in the United States
- Environmental issues in the United States
