= Gazelle (disambiguation) =

A gazelle is an antelope.

Gazelle may also refer to:

== Military ==
- Gazelle-class cruiser, a light cruiser class of the Imperial German Navy
  - SMS Gazelle, the lead ship of the class
- SMS Gazelle (1859), a screw-driven frigate of the Prussian Navy
- USS Gazelle, three United States Navy ships
- HMS Gazelle (J342), Royal Navy Catherine-class minesweeper during the Second World War
- Gazelle FRV, a scouting vehicle developed by Zimbabwe
- Aérospatiale Gazelle, a French-designed helicopter
- Operation Gazelle, an Israeli offensive in the Yom Kippur War
- 53T6 (NATO reporting name: ABM-3 Gazelle), a Russian anti-ballistic missile deployed in the Moscow area
- Gazelle Force, a battalion-size force in the East African Campaign of the Second World War

== Places ==
- Gazelle, California, a census-designated place
- Gazelle District, Papua New Guinea
- Gazelle Peninsula, Papua New Guinea
- Cape Gazelle, Papua New Guinea
- Gazelle Valley, an open space in Jerusalem

== Computing ==
- Gazelle (Internet company), an e-commerce company for electronic devices
- Gazelle (software company), a Japanese arcade game developer founded in 1994
- Gazelle (web browser), a web browser project by Microsoft
- Seattle Computer Products Gazelle, a computer
- Gazelle, the software used to run What.CD, the private torrent tracker

== Transportation ==
- Gazelle (bicycle), the largest bicycle manufacturer in the Netherlands
- Gazelle (motor vessel), a launch that operated in Oregon, US, 1905–1929
- Gazelle (sidewheeler 1854), a steamboat that operated in Oregon, US
- GAZelle, a series of mid-sized trucks, vans and buses made by Russian manufacturer GAZ
- Nissan Gazelle, a compact three-door hatchback produced by Nissan
- De Havilland DH.15 Gazelle, an engine test bed
- Hillman Gazelle, an automobile produced by Chrysler Australia
- Napier Gazelle, an aircraft engine
- Singer Gazelle, two generations of British motor cars
- Stutz Defender, later named Gazelle, an armored SUV
- Gazelle, a South Devon Railway Eagle class steam locomotive
- La Gazelle, a train service operated by the Congo–Ocean Railway

== Sports ==
- Gazelle FC, a football club in Chad
- Gazelle Stakes, an annual American Thoroughbred horse race at Aqueduct Racetrack in New York, US
- Willem II–Gazelle, a Dutch professional cycling team known as Gazelle in 1971

== Fictional characters ==
- Gazelle (DC Comics), a DC Comics character
- Gazelle (Marvel Comics), a Marvel Comics character
- Gazelle (New-Gen), another Marvel Comics character
- Gazelle, a character from Zootopia
- The Gazelles, three characters in Peppa Pig

== See also ==
- Gazell, a Swedish jazz record label
- Gazzelle (born 1989), Italian singer-songwriter
- HaZvi (also Hatzevi, meaning The Gazelle), a Hebrew-language newspaper published in Jerusalem from 1884 to 1914
