= Refash =

Marketplace for used clothing

Refash Pte Ltd
- Company type: Private
- Industry: Recommerce
- Founded: 2015
- Founder: Aloysius Sng
- Headquarters: Singapore and Malaysia
- Products: Clothing
- Website: refash.sg

Refash is a Singapore-based fashion recommerce platform for women to buy and sell preloved clothing. It runs an omni-channel model, with six physical stores in Singapore and Malaysia.

== History ==
Refash was founded in September 2015, by Aloysius Sng. It started off as a retail outlet in City Plaza, REFASH grew into a start-up launched in January 2016.

Refash is a graduate of SPH Plug and Play accelerator programme. In September 2016, REFASH raised a $400,000 seed funding. The round was led by Singapore's Tri5 Ventures, and joined by Malaysia-based Tinkbig Ventures, and an unnamed angel investor.

In June 2017, Refash launched its online site at refash.sg where sellers self-list their clothing.

== Overview ==
Refash is a platform for women to sell and buy preloved items, ranging from fast fashion clothing to designer handbags. Brands include fast fashion brands like Zara, Topshop, Forever 21 and H&M, and local brands like Ohvola, MDS and Love, Bonito. Refash handles all buyer enquiries, packaging, shipping, payments and returns on behalf of sellers, and provides image enhancement services for its online self-listing platform.

Refash was acquired by Carousell in 2022.
