= Pearl Automation =

- Company type: Private
- Founded: 2014
- Founder: Bryson Gardner, Joseph Fisher, Brian Sander
- Headquarters: Scotts Valley, CA
- Number of employees: 80
- Website: http://www.pearlauto.com

Pearl Automation Inc. was a company building aftermarket automobile technology, focused on delivering "driver awareness features" and helping to “speed up the pace” of technology adoption in cars. Pearl was founded by Bryson Gardner, Joseph Fisher, and Brian Sander in 2014 and announced its first product in June 2016. The company was based in Scotts Valley, California.

== Products ==
The Pearl Rear Vision product was purchased by American Road Products Inc. as Pearl Automation Inc. closed its operations.

Pearl’s first product, Rear Vision, was an aftermarket automotive backup camera and alert system that attaches around a license plate and sends video directly to your smartphone. The system is solar powered and included two wide angle high-definition cameras.

Pearl sells products directly to consumers through its website, Amazon.com and Crutchfield. In January 2017, Pearl announced a partnership with Installer Net.

The company went defunct in 2017.

== Funding ==
Pearl has raised a total of $50 million in Series A and B venture capital rounds, from investors Shasta Ventures, Accel, Venrock, and Wellcome Trust.
