= Access-independent services =

Service concept

Access-independent service (AIS) is a service concept in which a service does not depend on guaranteed access network cooperation for service delivery. Telecommunications industry analyst Dean Bubley first used the term in a report on Telco-OTT in February 2012.

Traditionally, most telecom company or internet service provider services are access-dependent, because they rely heavily on guaranteed access cooperation on the network the service is delivered over. For instance, traditional IP-based TV service (IPTV) delivered by a telecom company is generally a managed service. This means that IPTV service assumes the IPTV service provider has control over the access network that the IPTV service is delivered over, and network quality of service (QoS) guarantees are available for IPTV service delivery. As a result, the reach of a telecom company's IPTV service is generally restricted by the reach of the telecom company's access network.

In contrast, services offered by non-traditional video content delivery service providers such as Netflix, Hulu, and Amazon Video are considered access-independent services. Netflix's video content streaming service, for example, dynamically adapts to network conditions in real-time to strive for the best overall quality of experience (QoE) and does not assume guaranteed cooperation from the underlying IP network, such as QoS. As a result, without considering content rights and different countries' government restrictions, the reach of Netflix's video content streaming service is, in theory, the reach of the Internet. Skype is another example of AIS, because Skype offers an IP-based telephony service over the Internet without depending on IP network cooperation guarantees other than basic IP network connectivity.

In the context of telecom service delivery, the concept of access independent services is also commonly described by the term "over-the-top" (OTT) services. OTT service providers such as but not limited to Facebook, WeChat, and Netflix generally do not own or directly manage any wide-area access network to begin with, so they design their services for overall quality of experience, with no assumptions on guaranteed access network cooperation.
