= Bright Box =

- Company type: Private
- Industry: Connected Car
- Founded: 2012
- Founder: Ivan Mishanin, Ken Belotsky, Alexander Dimchenko
- Headquarters: Switzerland, Lausanne
- Area served: CIS, Europe, Middle East
- Products: Connected vehicle platform
- Number of employees: 200
- Website: https://remoto.com

Bright Box is a technology company with offices in Switzerland, Russia, Hungary, and the UAE. It develops a connected car platform that links drivers to their cars, and the vehicles to car manufacturers (original equipment manufacturer) and to dealerships. At the end of 2017 Zurich Insurance Group acquired the company.

== History ==
The company was founded in 2012 by Ivan Mishanin, Alexander Dimchenko and Ken Belotsky. They understood the key problematic issues car dealers would experience such as customers wanting cheaper services done by unregistered dealers. To solve this problem, the team at Bright Box has developed a mobile platform called Dealer Mobility, which is offered to dealers in the form of a mobile app and web portal. Several members of the management staff were involved in implementing a dealership management system (DMS) before 2012.

In 2014, the company began focusing on how to gather data from the vehicles and conveying this information to dealers for enhanced customer support. The idea was that a smartphone could control a car and that drivers are more likely to use mobile apps and the services of a car dealership. The results of a survey conducted by the company indicated that climate control, door lock, search of vehicle, and alerts about any impact or evacuation of the car were the most important features for car owners.

From 2014 to 2017, the company opened offices in Dubai, Switzerland, and Hungary. In June 2018, Bright Box opened a new office in Schaumburg, IL, with Zurich North America.

As part of Zurich Insurance Group, Bright Box joined one of the largest hackathons in Europe – HackZurich.

== Developments ==
The company developed a connected car platform called Remoto, which allows car owners to manage their cars remotely via smartphone.

Several automakers, including Honda, Infiniti, Kia Motors, Toyota, Hyundai, Mitsubishi and Nissan include Remoto in their cars.

In October 2016, Dubai Police signed a collaboration agreement with the company and Nissan Middle East for the safety technology service called "Smart Response".

In the event of an accident, the system works in tandem with the patented Nissan SmartCar "control system" to alert Dubai Police immediately.

Bright Box is a permanent supplier of the end-user communication channel and the dealerships for the Motor Car Group, one of the largest dealerships group in Eastern Europe.

The company collaborates with Post Luxembourg, Cisco Jasper, Microsoft.

In June 2018, Bright Box was recognized as a Microsoft Country Partner of the Year. In August 2018, the company partnered with the MINI USA, a division of the BMW Group, to develop a custom mobile communication platform for the car owners road rally.
