= Kineto =

Kineto is a word meaning movement and may refer to:

- Kineto Limited, a film company established by Charles Urban
- Kineto Theatre in Forest, Ontario
- Kineto Tracking Mount, used with Directed-energy weapons
- Kineto Wireless, a California based company
