= Yoogi's Closet =

Online fashion resale store

- Type: Private
- Industry: Recommerce
- Founded: 2008 in Seattle, WA
- Founders: Simon Han; Eugenia Han
- Headquarters: Seattle, WA, United States
- Products: Used Luxury Handbags, Clothing, Shoes, Accessories, and Jewelry
- Revenue: ▲$4,740,000 (2011); ▲$6,000,000 (2012); ▲$10,050,000 (2013)
- Website: www.yoogiscloset.com

Yoogi's Closet is an online fashion resale store for buying and selling women's luxury secondhand goods. It was co-founded in 2008 by Simon Han and his spouse, Eugenia Han, in Seattle, Washington. The company's name is based on Eugenia's nickname, “Yoogi,” and many of the store's initial goods came from her collection. The company's main selling point is the guaranteed authenticity of each designer item, each of which is professionally examined.

Yoogi's Closet's annual revenue increased by 548% between 2009 and 2013, rising from $1.55 million to $10.05 million. Despite investor interest, Yoogi's Closet has avoided outside funding, allowing management to make operational changes without investor approval.

== Recognition ==
Yoogi's Closet has appeared in Puget Sound Business Journal's list of 100 fastest growing private companies three years in a row (2012, 2013, and 2014).

In 2014, Yoogi's Closet was nominated for Geekwire's Bootstrapper of the Year award.
