= Over-the-top media service =

Service delivering video and audio over the Internet

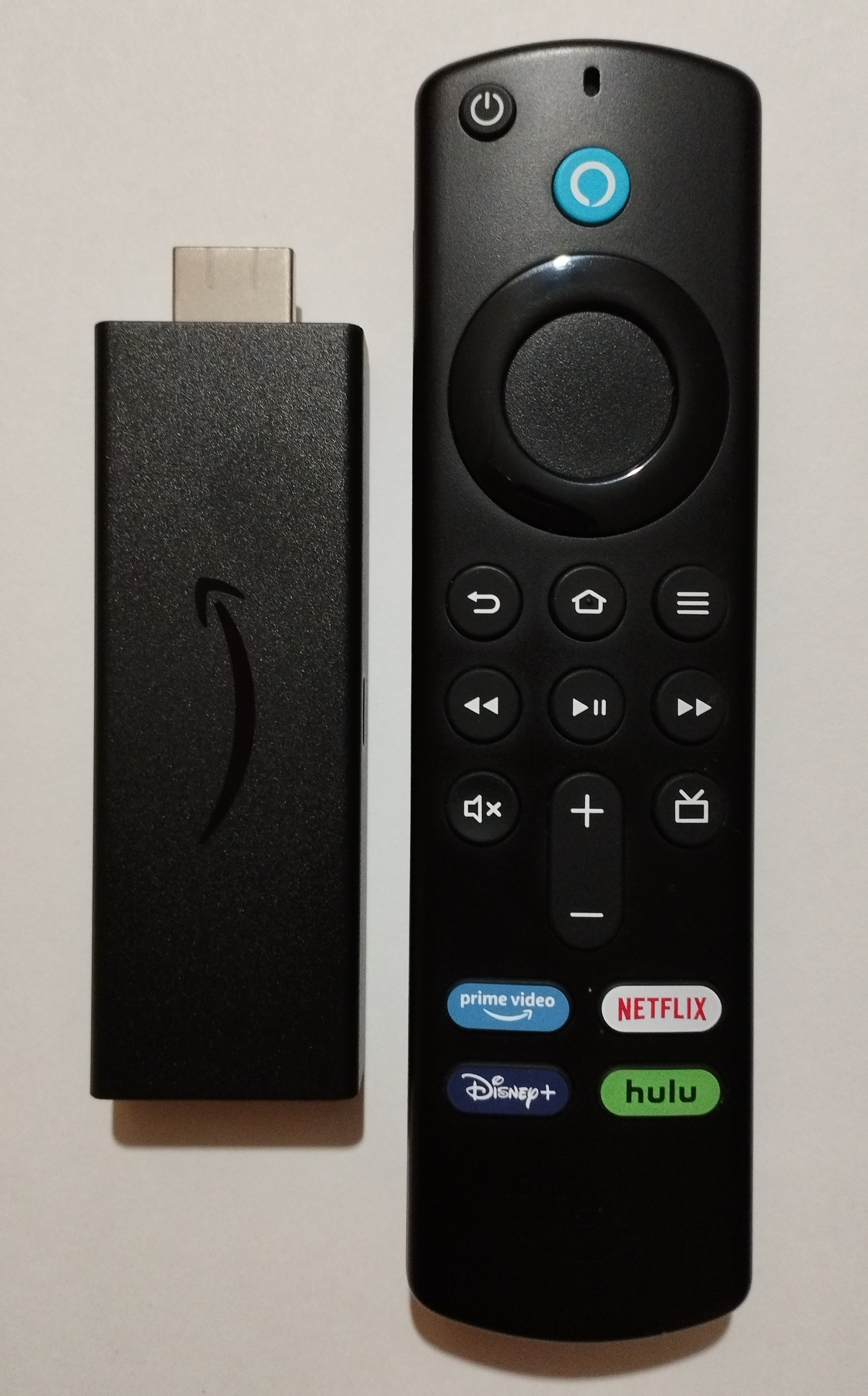
OTT service buttons on Amazon Fire TV digital media player

An over-the-top media service (also known as OTT and over-the-top television) is a digital distribution service of video and accompanying audio delivered directly to viewers via the public Internet, rather than through over-the-air, cable, and satellite television service or Internet Protocol television (IPTV) (Note: IPTV is the delivery of television content using signals based on the logical Internet protocol, rather than through traditional terrestrial and satellite signal, and cable television format.) provider. The term is synonymous with streaming platform.

Video OTT services may be subscription-based (SVOD) or free (FAST), and are typically accessed via television sets with integrated Smart TV platforms, digital media players such as Apple TV, Amazon Fire TV and Roku, video game consoles, websites on personal computers, and apps on smartphones and tablets.

OTT bypasses broadcast, cable, and satellite transmissions—the system through which companies have traditionally acted as controllers or distributors of television content. This content may include shows and movies for which the OTT acquired licensed rights from the content owner. Programming may also include original content produced by the service or specifically for it. By financing and producing their own original episodic series and films, and providing unscripted programs, live sports and events, many OTT services, such as Netflix, operate as modern counterparts to television networks.

OTT service includes streaming services such as Disney+ and Prime Video which offer subscription-based film and television content (SVOD), or free ad-supported streaming television (FAST) such as Pluto TV and Tubi. OTT services also include a range of "skinny" television packages by streaming platforms, such as Sling TV and Hulu with Live TV, that provide live streams of specialty channels.

OTT TV, commonly called streaming television, constituted 38% of global television viewing in 2023. OTT service became the most popular method for watching television in the United States in 2025.

Streaming platforms are also the primary method for the delivery of radio, music, podcasts, and audiobooks over the Internet, known as audio streaming. Audio streaming is provided through streaming services such as BBC Sounds, Spotify, and Pandora.

== History ==
The origin of OTT dates to March 1998, when Hong Kong Telecom launched interactive multimedia service iTV, the world's first video on demand streaming platform. The service also featured music on demand and racing-on-demand. iTV lasted four years before ceasing operations in 2002.

== Definitions ==
In 2011, the Canadian Radio-television and Telecommunications Commission (CRTC), Canada's telecommunications regulator, stated that it "considers that Internet access to programming independent of a facility or network dedicated to its delivery (via, for example, cable or satellite) is the defining feature of what have been termed 'over-the-top' services".

The United States Federal Communications Commission (FCC) categorizes OTT services into two groups: online video distributors (OVDs) and multichannel video programming distributors (MVPDs). Virtual MVPDs include such services such as DirecTV Stream, FuboTV, Sling TV, Hulu + Live TV and YouTube TV. The FCC defined an OVD as:

any entity that provides video programming by means of the Internet or other Internet Protocol (IP)-based transmission path where the transmission path is provided by a person other than the OVD. An OVD does not include an MVPD inside its MVPD footprint or an MVPD to the extent it is offering online video programming as a component of an MVPD subscription to customers whose homes are inside its MVPD footprint.

In contrast to video on demand systems offered by cable and IPTV, which operate over managed networks where channels can be changed instantly and thus content available instantaneously, services such as iTunes required that a video download be completed before it was played; compared to IPTV which started playing a video before it finished downloading.

== Background ==
In broadcasting, over-the-top content is video, audio, and other media content delivered over the Internet without the involvement of a multiple-system operator (MSO) in the control or distribution of the content. The Internet service provider (ISP) may be aware of the contents of the IP packets and may be able to block or restrict their transit to end users (unless that internet provider operates within a jurisdiction that requires "net neutrality"). However, the ISP is not responsible for the viewing abilities, copyrights, and/or other redistribution of the content from the OTT provider. This model contrasts with the purchasing or rental of video or audio content from an ISP, such as pay television, video on demand and IPTV.

OTT television signals are received over the Internet or through a cell phone network, as opposed to receiving television signals from terrestrial broadcasters, cable networks, or via satellite transmission. The video distributor controls access through an app, a separate OTT dongle, or a box connected to a phone, personal computer, or smart television set.

OTT TV is delivered via the public Internet instead of cable and satellite television, or IPTV, services using exclusive equipment such as set-top boxes. An ISP simply transports the Internet Protocol (IP) packets that deliver OTT content to the end-user.

Consumers can access OTT content through Internet-connected devices such as Smart TVs, streaming devices, video game consoles, set-top boxes, desktop and laptop computers, tablets, and smartphones.

By mid-2017, 58 percent of US households accessed one OTT service in a given month through a streaming device, game console, or Smart TV; with 84 per cent of advertising revenues originating from OTT channels, exceeding revenues from videos playing in web browsers on desktops and laptops. The results of a 2018 in-house data analysis of their subscribers by Uscreen (a membership platform for video creators and entrepreneurs) reported that 45% used iOS and Android mobile devices to access their OTT content, while 39% used web browsers for streaming.

Technologies such as cloud computing, data analytics, and the Internet of Things (IoT) have influenced development of the OTT media landscape. These technologies have been adopted by OTT providers in response to changing consumer preferences. IoT device integration enables OTT providers to offer personalized viewing experiences across such as a smart televisions and connected home appliances. OTT platforms use loT-drived data to provide personalized content recommendations based on user preferences. Cloud computing provides scalable infrastructure for delivering streaming on demand content. Cloud-based infrastructure allows OTT providers to scale resources, manage data and distribute content in response to changes in demand.

== Progress ==
In 2019, the record of simultaneous users watching an OTT event was set at 18.6 million in India by Disney Entertainment's video streaming platform Hotstar. This was surpassed in 2023 with 59 million concurrent viewers on Disney+ Hotstar. In 2025, the record was broken again with 61.2 million viewers on JioHotstar. (Note: Disney+ Hotstar India and JioCinema merged to form JioHotstar on February 14, 2025. Hotstar was launched February 11, 2015 and rebranded as Disney+ Hotstar on April 3, 2020. JioCinema was launched on May 4, 2016.)

By June 2021, streaming accounted for 26% of all television viewing, compared to 39% for cable and 25% for broadcast. In 2023, the viewing of TV content on streaming platforms represented 38% of global television consumption with 1.8 billion subscriptions to OTT platforms. In 2024, OTT TV became the most popular content in the US. (Note: "What started as [a] niche corner in the media landscape in the early 2000s has grown to the dominant form of TV viewing in the U.S.") By May 2025, the use of streaming platforms in the US had increased 71% since 2021, with streaming representing 44.8% of all television viewership, surpassing broadcast and cable television combined.

== Streaming platforms ==
Examples of OTT platforms with over 1 million subscribers include:

- Acorn TV (UK-US)
- Amazon Prime Video (US)
- AMC+ (US)
- Apple TV (US)
- BBC iPlayer (UK)
- Binge (Australia)
- BritBox (UK)
- Chorki (Bangladesh)
- Coupang Play (South Korea)
- Crave (Canada)
- Crunchyroll (US)
- Curiosity Stream (US)
- Discovery+ (US)
- Disney+ (US)
- Dropout (US)
- ESPN (US)
- Fox One (US)
- FuboTV (US)
- Fuji TV On Demand (Japan)
- Hami Video (Taiwan)
- Hayu (US)
- HBO Max (US)
- Hulu (US)
- Iflix (Malaysia)
- iQIYI (China)
- iWant (Philippines)
- JioHotstar (India)
- Kocowa (US)
- MGM+ (US)
- Mubi (UK)
- Netflix (US)
- NFL+ (US)
- Paramount+ (US)
- Peacock (US)
- Philo (US)
- Plex (US)
- Pluto TV (US)
- Rakuten Viki (US)
- The Roku Channel (US)
- Showmax (South Africa)
- Shudder (US)
- Sling TV (US)
- SonyLIV (India)
- Stan. (Australia)
- Starz (US)
- Tubi (US)
- TVING (South Korea)
- TVNZ+ (New Zealand)
- U-Next (Japan)
- Vidio (Indonesia)
- Viu (China)
- Youku (China)
- YouTube TV (US)
- ZEE5 (India)

== Mobile communication ==
The term "OTT" has also been used to describe no-carrier cellphones, for which all communications are charged as data, avoiding monopolistic competition, or apps for phones that transmit data in this manner, including both those that replace other call methods and those that update software.

OTT messaging is defined as instant messaging services or online chat provided by third parties, as an alternative to text messaging services provided by a mobile network operator. An example is the Meta Platforms-owned mobile application WhatsApp, that serves to replace text messaging on Internet connected smartphones. Other providers of OTT messaging include Viber, WeChat, iMessage, Skype, Telegram and the now defunct Google Allo.

OTT voice calling, usually called VoIP, capabilities, for instance, a softphone or as provided by FaceTime, Skype, Viber, WhatsApp, WeChat, and Zoom use open internet communication protocols to replace and sometimes enhance existing operator controlled services offered by mobile phone operators.

== See also ==
- TV Everywhere
- Media aggregation platform
- Multi-screen video
- Content delivery network
- Access-independent services
- Home theater PC
- Multichannel television in the United States
- Over-the-top media services in India
- List of smart TV platforms
- Music streaming service
