= Basel Action Network =

American nonprofit environmental organization

Coordinates: 47.600663°N 122.334033°W

- Type: Environmental justice, human rights
- Headquarters: Seattle, Washington, United States
- Leader: Hayley Palmer; Jim Puckett
- Website: Official website

The Basel Action Network (BAN), a charitable non-governmental organization, works to combat the export of toxic waste from technology and other products from industrialized societies to developing countries. BAN is based in Seattle, Washington, United States, with a partner office in the Philippines. BAN is named after the Basel Convention, a 1989 United Nations treaty designed to control and prevent the dumping of toxic wastes, particularly on developing countries. BAN serves as an unofficial watchdog and promoter of the Basel Convention and its decisions.

== Campaigns ==
BAN currently runs four campaigns focusing on decreasing the amount of toxins entering the environment and protecting underdeveloped countries from serving as a toxic dump of the developed countries of the world. These include:

=== The e-Stewards Initiative ===
BAN's e-Stewards Electronics Stewardship campaign seeks to prevent toxic trade in hazardous electronic waste and includes a certification program for responsible electronics recycling known as the e-Stewards Initiative. It is available to electronics recyclers after they prove to have environmentally and socially responsible recycling techniques following audits conducted by accredited certifying bodies. Recyclers can become e-Steward certified after proving that they follow all national and international laws concerning electronic waste and its proper disposal, which includes bans on exporting, land dumping, incineration, and use of prison labor. When the e-Stewards initiative was initially started with the Electronics TakeBack Coalition, it was called "The Electronics Recycler's Pledge of True Stewardship". In the beginning, the initiative verified a recycler's participation through "desk" and paper audits only. The e-Stewards certification, however, has been updated and requires compliance verification by a third party auditor.

=== Green ship recycling ===
BAN has teamed up with several other non-governmental organizations (NGOs), including Greenpeace to form the NGO Platform on Shipbreaking. The platform is focused on the responsible ship breaking disposal of end-of-life shipping vessels. The overall purpose of the platform is to stop the illegal dumping of toxic waste traveling from developed countries to undeveloped countries. The platform is focused on finding more sustainable, environmentally and socially responsible disposal techniques of disposing of such wastes, which can be achieved through a system where the polluter will be responsible for paying any fees associated with the legal and safe disposal of ships and other marine vessels. The NGO platform endorses the principles outlined in the Basel Convention on the Control of Transboundary Movements of Hazardous Wastes and their Disposal.

== See also ==
- Computer recycling
- Electronic waste in the United States
- Environmental issues in the United States
