= Media aggregation platform =

Service to distribute web-based streaming media

A Media Aggregation Platform or Media Aggregation Portal (MAP) is an over the top service for distributing web-based streaming media content from multiple sources to a large audience. MAPs consist of networks of sources who host their own content which viewers can choose and access directly from a larger variety of content to choose from than a single source can offer. The service is used by content providers, looking to extend the reach of their content.

Unlike multichannel video programming distributor (MVPD) or multiple-system operators (MSO), MAPs rely on the Internet rather than cables or satellite. As more network television channels have moved online in the early 21st century, joining web-native channels like Netflix, MAPs aggregate content the way that MSOs and MVPDs have used cable, and to a lesser extent satellite and IPTV infrastructure. When compared with MSOs and MVPDs, MAP networks have much lower costs due to lack of physical infrastructure. The majority of revenue from MAP services are retained by the content creators, and revenue is instead collected from advertisements, pay-per-view, and subscription-based content offerings instead of licensing and reselling content. MAP service consumers interact and purchase content directly from its source, without the markup added by a middleman.

== See also ==
- Broadcast networks
- Internet Protocol television (IPTV)
- Multichannel video programming distributor (MVPD)
- Multiple system operator (MSO)
- Over-the-air (OTA)
- Over-the-top (OTT)
- Pay TV
- Streaming Media
- Streaming television
- Video on demand (VOD)
