= Love, Bonito =

Womenswear fashion brand

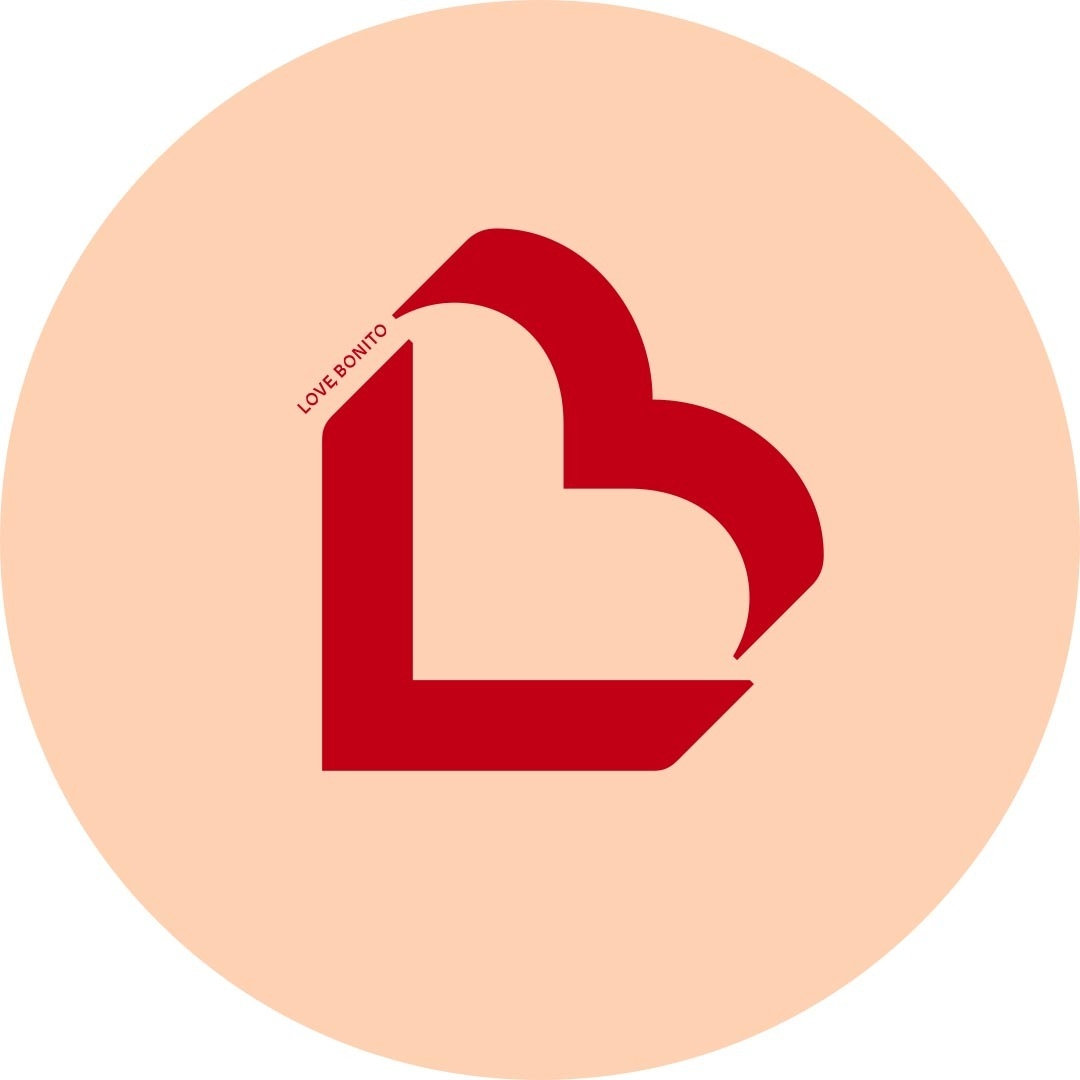
- Formerly: BonitoChico
- Industry: Apparel & fashion
- Founded: 2010
- Founder: Rachel Lim, Velda Tan, and Viola Tan
- Key people: Dione Song, CEO
- Website: www.lovebonito.com/sg

Love, Bonito is a Singapore-based womenswear company founded in 2010. The brand has a total of 27 stores in six markets across Asia, including Singapore, Malaysia, Indonesia, Cambodia, Hong Kong, and the Philippines. The brand offers three collections: Signatures, Staples, and Capsule.

== History ==
Love, Bonito was co-founded by Rachel Lim and sisters Velda and Viola Tan. It initially began as a digital blogshop called BonitoChico in 2005 on the Livejournal platform, where it sold pre-loved apparel. In 2010, the brand officially rebranded and launched an official website under the name Love, Bonito. The company opened its first physical store in Singapore in 2017.

In 2019, Love, Bonito entered the U.S. market through EnterpriseSG's Scale-Up Program and subsequently opened a pop-up store in SoHo, New York.

In 2022, Love, Bonito acquired the women-led activewear brand Butter, which was later rebranded as Cheak. Additionally, the company made a minor investment in the Singaporean natural healthcare start-up Moom Health.

In 2023, Love, Bonito opened its largest outlet in Hong Kong, with a grand opening event featuring fashion photographer Saskia Lawaks, singer and rapper Tyson Yoshi, and neon light artist Chankalun. The event also included DJ Mengzy and mural artist Zoie Lam. In the same year, Love, Bonito reported $88 million in revenue, representing a 37% increase compared to the previous year, along with a 27% reduction in losses.

In 2024, Love, Bonito underwent a rebranding campaign titled "Ready to Live, Not Just Ready To Wear," featuring Korean-American actress and singer Arden Cho, Malaysian musician Yuna, American author and artist Chanel Miller, and Singaporean-American mother-daughter content creator duo Gym Tan and Mya Rose Miller. The rebrand introduced a new logo with the initials "LB" arranged into a heart-shaped monogram, replacing the previous text-based logo "Love, Bonito."

In August 2024, Love, Bonito opened its first store in Makati, Philippines.

In April 2025, Love, Bonito partnered with Asian American Girl Club and launched TrailBlazer.

== Awards and recognitions ==
- Co-founder Rachel Lim and CEO Dione Song were both included in the 2023 edition of The Business of Fashion (BoF) 500.
- In 2024, Love, Bonito was ranked #74 on the list of Singapore's Fastest-Growing Companies, compiled by The Straits Times and the Germany-based global research firm Statista.
- Glamour recognized Love, Bonito as one of the Asian American and Native Hawaiians/Pacific Islander (AANHPI)- and Asian-owned Fashion Brands to Support.
- Harper's Bazaar named Love, Bonito as one of Singapore's Fashion Brands to Shop Now and one of the Singaporean Brands That Have Gone Global.
