= Digex =

One of the first Internet service providers in the United States

- Industry: Telecommunications
- Founded: 1991; 35 years ago
- Founder: Doug Humphrey; Mike Doughney
- Defunct: 2003; 23 years ago
- Fate: Acquired by Worldcom
- Headquarters: Laurel, Maryland, United States
- Key people: George L. Kerns, CEO & President; T. Scott Zimmerman, CFO
- Services: Internet service provider
- Revenue: ▼$187 million (2002)
- Net income: ▼ -$246 million (2002)
- Total assets: ▼$220 million (2002)
- Total equity: ▼ -$42 million (2002)
- Number of employees: 785 (2002)

Digex, Inc. was one of the first Internet service providers in the United States.

During the dot-com bubble, its stock price rose to $184 per share; the company was acquired for $1 per share a few years later.

== History ==
Digital Express Group, predecessor to DIGEX, was founded by Doug Humphrey and Mike Doughney in the basement of Mr. Humphrey's townhouse in Greenbelt, Maryland in 1991, offering web hosting services and Internet access.

In 1995, the company raised $8 million from Grotech Capital and Venrock.

In October 1996, the company became a public company via an initial public offering. The company employed 260 people by that year.

In 1997, the company was acquired by Intermedia Communications, a competitive local exchange carrier based in Tampa, Florida.

In 1999, Intermedia completed the partial corporate spin-off of Digex.

In 2000, Microsoft and Compaq invested $100 million in Digex.

In September 2000, WorldCom acquired Intermedia Communications and gained a majority stake in Digex.

In 2003, WorldCom acquired the remainder of the company.

Verizon acquired Worldcom in 2006 and integrated the company into Verizon Business.

=== Streaming media ===
In 1995, Digex launched ISP-TV, a network of linked CU-SeeMe videotelephony servers from multiple ISPs to provide for large-audience webcasts via streaming media.

In 1996, ISP-TV began producing original video content in one of the first "cyberstudios" in Laurel, Maryland. Shows included "Angry Girl" a show hosted by Humphrey's wife, "Wired for Cinema" a film review show, "Head" (a beer show) and "Meeks Unfiltered" with MSNBC correspondent Brock Meeks.

Digex also streamed Bud Bowl during the Super Bowl for Anheuser-Busch. In 1999 Apple hired Digex to stream the Star Wars trailer in QuickTime format. This industry first saturated the internet bandwidth at the time but proved that video streaming had a future.
