= Jasper Technologies =

Software development company

Jasper Technologies, Inc.
- Formerly: Jasper Wireless, Inc.
- Type: Subsidiary
- Industry: Cloud computing, software
- Founded: 2004
- Founder: Jahangir Mohammed
- Headquarters: Santa Clara, California, United States
- Number of locations: Atlanta, Georgia, Singapore, United Kingdom
- Area served: Worldwide
- Key people: Daniel Collins, Amit Gupta (co-founders)
- Services: Cloud platform, M2M
- Number of employees: ~400
- Website: www.jasper.com

Jasper Technologies, Inc., formerly Jasper Wireless, Inc., was an American software developer that provided a cloud-based software platform for the Internet of Things (IoT). Jasper's platform was designed to aid in launching, managing, and monetizing the deployment of IoT for enterprise businesses. Founded in 2004, Jasper partners with over 120 mobile operator networks to serve IoT and machine-to-machine (M2M) companies in different industries, including automotive, home security and automation, agriculture, food and beverage, wearable technology, healthcare, advertising and industrial equipment.

On February 3, 2016, Cisco Systems announced its plans to acquire Jasper for $1.4 billion. The deal was finalized on March 22, 2016. With the acquisition, Jasper became the IoT Cloud business unit within Cisco. Jasper's CEO, Jahangir Mohammed, is now the GM of the IoT Cloud business unit – reporting to Rowan Trollope, SVP of the IoT and Collaboration Technology Group at Cisco.

== History ==
Jahangir Mohammed, along with his colleagues Amit Gupta and Daniel Collins founded Jasper Wireless in 2004. Prior to Jasper, Mohammed founded Kineto Wireless while working at Bell Labs. He is the holder of over 80 U.S. and international patents related to IoT, mobile communications and software. He is also credited to have contributed to technologies used to converge GSM and Wi-Fi that have become GSMA standards. Jasper is privately owned and was founded with venture funding from Sequoia Capital and Benchmark Capital. Jasper Technologies, Inc. is headquartered in Santa Clara, state CA. Jasper employs approximately 400 people. In May 2014, Jasper Wireless became Jasper Technologies.

Jasper was selected for the 2015 World Economic Forum Technology Pioneer award which recognizes technology companies impacting business and society. In February 2016, Cisco announced that they made an acquisition offer of $1.4 billion to acquire Jasper Technologies, "We’ve been keeping an eye on this market and what we noticed was that Jasper represented a unique asset. We believe they are the largest Internet of Things service platform of scale today." The acquisition was finalized in March that same year and the company was renamed from Jasper Technologies to Cisco Technologies. Following the acquisition by Cisco, Mohammed is now the GM of the IoT Cloud business unit.

== Product ==
=== Jasper Control Center Platform ===
The Jasper Control Center Platform is a cloud-based product that allows enterprises to launch, manage and monetize an Internet of Things (IoT) deployment using a single turnkey result. The Jasper Control Center delivers visibility and real-time control for connected service businesses, along with IoT/ Machine to Machine (M2M) capabilities like provisioning, mobile service management, real-time engagement, support diagnostics, billing and business automation. The platform is deeply integrated with 35 mobile operator groups, that represent various worldwide companies—including: AT&T, China Unicom, Telefónica, SoftBank, NTT DoCoMo, América Móvil, SingTel, Telenor, and Telstra.

Jasper's platform operates on a single base of code that can be configured to meet specialized enterprise needs across a wide range of business models, technologies, and industries.

=== Functionality ===
Jasper's Connected Car Cloud is used by eleven automotive OEMs (original equipment manufacturer) worldwide including General Motors, Nissan, Ford Motor Company, Volkswagen, and Tesla Motors. The Jasper platform enables carmakers to offer real-time diagnostics, safety, security, information and entertainment services, as well as apps and Wi-Fi hotspot services. The Jasper platform is also used by companies like Coca-Cola, Starbucks, GE Aviation, Allstate, Audi, and Garmin to offer new IoT services. Coca-Cola is known to use Jasper to connect vending machines, which can help notify the respective manager of inventory and service needs. As opposed to that, GE is known to use the Jasper platform for their connected jet engines, which provide performance data to their service teams on the ground, intended to reduce maintenance costs and increase engine life span.

== Strategic Partnerships ==
- Microsoft Azure – On July 30, 2015, Jasper and Microsoft Azure IoT Suite announced partnership to accelerate enterprise deployment and global growth of IoT services worldwide.
- Salesforce.com – On March 3, 2015, Jasper and Salesforce announced partnership that aims to help enterprises lower the cost, reduce time-to-market and enable global scale for their IoT deployments.
- SAP SE – On March 3, 2015, Jasper and SAP announced a partnership whereby Jasper's Control Center platform is integrated with the SAP HANA® platform, intended to create business value for customers and partners by analyzing service subscription and usage data and shortening time to market for IoT services.
- Reliance Communications – Reliance Communications, a telecommunications service provider, partnered with Jasper to manage and monetise Next-Generation IoT businesses.

== Awards and recognition ==
- 2017 GSMA Global Mobile Awards Winner: Best Mobile Innovation for Automotive
- 2015 GSMA Global Mobile Awards Winner: Best Mobile Innovation for the ‘Internet of Things’
- 2015 Technology Pioneer: World Economic Forum Recognizes 24 Leading Technology Pioneers
- 2014 World Communication Awards Winner: The Connected World Initiative
- 2014 Total Telecom Internet of Things Awards Winner: Project of the Year
- 2014 Total Telecom Internet of Things Awards Winner: Contribution to the IoT Eco-System
- 2014 Broadband Infovision Awards: Best Internet of Things Innovation
- Gold Stevie Award Winner: Executive of the Year – Computer Software – Up to 500 Employees: Jahangir Mohammed, Founder & CEO of Jasper
- Gold Stevie Award Winner: Company of the Year – Computer Software – More Than 250 Employees
- Computer Business Review's Top 5 Networking Companies Driving IoT
- The Journal and Dow Jones VentureSource include Jasper in “The Billion Dollar Startup Club”
- M2M Wire: Jasper wins 2014 Telecoms.com Award for progress in M2M and IoT
- GSMA World Congress: Jasper wins “Best Cloud-Based Technology for Mobile” at Global Mobile Awards 2013
