= Kineto Wireless =

- Type: Private
- Industry: Mobile telecommunications software and hardware
- Founded: 1 January 2001
- Headquarters: Milpitas, California
- Area served: Worldwide
- Key people: Jeffrey Brown - President and CEO (June 2009)
- Products: Smart Comms; Smart Wi-Fi; Cellular Type (GSM)
- Website: www.Kineto.com

Kineto Wireless is based in Milpitas, California and provides telco-OTT services to the mobile industry. Kineto's services enhance and extend communications services out over IP-based networks, such as the Internet.

Kineto is a privately held, venture-backed company whose investors, including Venrock Associates, Sutter Hill Ventures, Oak Investment Partners and SeaPointVentures.

Customers and partners include Acme Packet, HTC Corporation, Huawei, LG Electronics, Motorola, NewPace, Orange (telecommunications), Rogers Wireless, Research in Motion, Samsung Group, SFR, T-Mobile USA and ZTE.

The company innovated Unlicensed Mobile Access (UMA), also known as Generic Access Network (GAN).
