= USS Gazelle =

USS Gazelle is a name used more than once by the U.S. Navy:

- USS Gazelle (1863), was a side-wheel steamer commissioned February 1864
- Gazelle (BAM-17), was transferred to the United Kingdom 28 July 1943 as HMS Gazelle (J342). Returned to the United States December 1946, she was struck from the Navy List 10 June 1947
- USS Gazelle (IX-116), was an auxiliary oiler commissioned 29 November 1943
