= Gazelle (motor vessel) =

Gasoline-powered launch

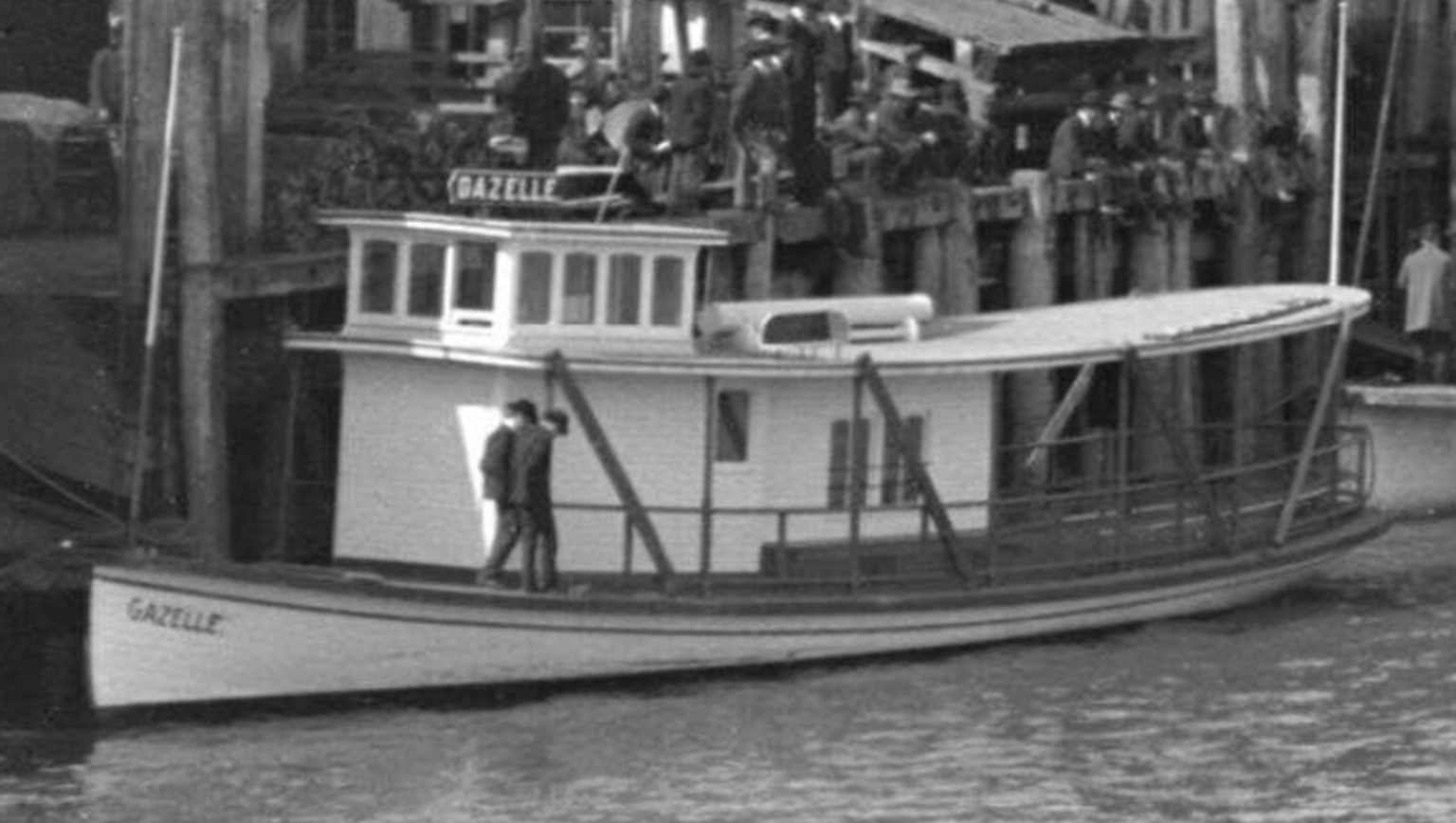

History
- Name: Gazelle
- Owner: McLean & Key; O.S. Hosford; Lane Bros.
- Route: Willamette and Columbia rivers; Yaquina Bay; Oregon coast
- Launched: March 16, 1905
- Identification: U.S. 204750
- Fate: Abandoned 1929

General characteristics
- Type: inland and coastal excursion launch and ferry (1905-1909; 1910-1911); offshore fishing vessel (1909)
- Length: 50 ft (15.24 m)
- Beam: 12.3 ft (3.75 m)
- Depth: 3.4 ft (1.04 m) depth of hold
- Installed power: Gasoline engine
- Propulsion: propeller
- Capacity: 100 passengers (1911)

Gazelle was a gasoline powered launch that operated on the Willamette and Columbia river from 1905 to 1911. For short periods of time Gazelle was operated on the Oregon Coast, on Yaquina Bay and also as an off-shore fishing vessel, in the Coos Bay area.

== Construction ==
Gazelle was built in Portland, Oregon in 1905. Gazelle was launched on March 16, 1905.

Gazelle was taken on its trial run on March 17, 1905, in Portland, Oregon harbor. According to a contemporary report, Gazelle was 55 ft (16.76 m) long. According to the official merchant vessel registry, Gazelle was 50 ft (15.24 m) long with a beam of 12.3 ft (3.75 m) and depth of hold of 3.4 ft (1.04 m).

The gasoline engine that had been in the motor vessel Jessie Harkins had been installed into Gazelle. The engine was reported to generate 50 indicated horsepower. Gazelle's official merchant vessel registry number was 204751. Passenger capacity in 1905 was reported to be 75 persons.

== Early career ==
The original owners of Gazelle were McLean & Key, of La Grande, Oregon. According to a contemporaneous report, the builder's plan was to use Gazelle in connection with the Lewis and Clark Centennial Exposition, which was to be held in Portland starting on June 1, 1905. In June 1905 Gazelle carried officials of the Portland Rowing Club in connection with shell racing events. A non-contemporaneous history states that Gazelle was built in Portland for service at Astoria.

Also in June 1905 Gazelle was used for tourist excursions up the Columbia river.

In July 1905 Gazelle was used to make runs from Portland to the Oaks Amusement Park. In the second half of August 1905, Gazelle was put to work pulling out old pilings at the foot of Oak Street.

In August 1905, Capt. C.J. McLean, owner and operator of Gazelle, bought the Stark Street float and boat landing from Anderson & Crowe, who had constructed the facility before the Lewis & Clark Exposition. McLean planned to use the property for a good number of the gasoline launches operating in Portland harbor. McLean also intended to engage in a general towing and jobbing business, with the assistance of P.Z. Davis.

In December 1905, McLean advertised Gazelle as running from the Stark Street dock downriver for St. Johns and Linnton, and way points, as well as any ship in the harbor, departing at 7:30 a.m. and 2:30 p.m. Gazelle left St. Johns at 9:00 a.m. and 5:30 p.m.

== Safety issues ==
At just under 15 tons (a measure of size, not weight) Gazelle was considered one of the larger launches. These small vessels were sometimes called the "mosquito fleet" in contemporary accounts. Gasoline-powered vessels smaller than 15 gross tons were not subject to the jurisdiction or safety requirements of the Steamboat Inspection Service.

=== Collision with rowboat ===
On the evening of July 23, 1905, while Gazelle was moving upriver towards the Oaks, it collided with a rowboat occupied by four people, reported to be Mr. and Mrs. Mark R. Colby and R.W. Trussell and wife. According to Colby, the collision occurred near the downriver end of Ross Island just before 10:00 p.m.

The rowboat was displaying a light at its bow, but according to Colby, no light could be seen displayed by the launch. He first noticed the launch about 50 yards away when he heard the sound of a gasoline engine. Colby called out to alert the launch to turn aside, but this was not availing. Although the rowboat was overturned and the four people in it thrown in the water, fortunately no one was drowned.

The next day, Gazelle’s captain, C.J. McLean, gave a different account of events. According to McLean, the lights on Gazelle were burning, and the light on the rowboat was not visible, as he had found to be commonly the case. The shouts from the rowboat were confusing as to which direction they wanted Gazelle to turn, and he had done everything he could to avoid the collision.

=== Equipment deficiencies ===
On Monday August 7, 1905, a reporter searched among the passenger-carrying gasoline launches serving the Portland area, and found that only one of them, Gloria, carried any life preservers on board. Gloria often carried 35 to 40 people and had only two life preservers fastened to two long lines.

The occasion for the reporter’s inquiry was the recent death of two people, Fred and Madeline Steffenson, who were drowned as a result of a collision involving the gasoline launch Fox. According to the reporter for the Morning Oregonian, had Fox been properly equipped with life preservers, it is unlikely that the Steffensons would have drowned.

Steamboat Inspector Fuller was quoted at the time as saying "I believe there are more gasoline launches in our district than in any other in the country. On Coos Bay alone there are 90 launches. There are several hundred on the Willamette and the Columbia."

It happened that George Uhler, Supervising Inspector-General of the Steamboat Inspection Service was in Portland at the time. Uhler was reported to have said that nothing but Congress could include launches under 15 tons in size within the requirements for inspection. Uhler reiterated the statement that he had made in his last report to the Department of Commerce and Labor, where he called attention to the fact that there were only a few gasoline launches large enough to be subject to inspections (only 209 in the last fiscal year) and compared to a tremendous number of vessels just under the inspection threshold.

The newspaper account in the Morning Oregonian laid the blame on the Standard Oil Company, which sold the gasoline to the motor launches. The Oregonian stated the issue:

Every launch-owner knows that the law is wrong in principle but he does not scruple to take advantage of it. Steamers are rigidly inspected, but the magic word of ‘gasoline’ is a defiance to the Inspector. Take an instance of the boats plying the Willamette this Summer. The steamer Canby was allowed only 50 passengers. It meant a heavy fine to be caught with more on board. Yet the launches Gazelle, Princess May, Fox and others frequently carried a dozen more than 50 though they are of smaller size. The Canby had to carry life preservers. The launches did not.

=== Grounding ===
Gazelle was built before riverine vessels were equipped with Wireless. When in trouble, help had to be summoned in other ways. For example, when Gazelle was coming up the Willamette River on the night of Friday, December 8, 1905, the vessel missed the channel and struck ground near St. Johns. A crewman had to wade ashore and place a telephone call for assistance, after which a passing steamer pulled Gazelle off the bottom.

== Sale to O.S. Hosford ==
On August 28, 1906, Capt. O.S. (or O.W.) Hosford bought Gazelle from McLean & Key. Hosford intended to keep Gazelle on the same route that it had been running on, from Portland to Linnton. Hosford paid $1,363 for Gazelle, which was considered a bargain price. McLean, the former owner, was to remain in command. Gazelle had been doing a lot of harbor jobbing work, but had lost a lot of money during the Lewis & Clark fair, and for that reason was sold for a price that was considered very low.

== Transfer to Yaquina Bay ==
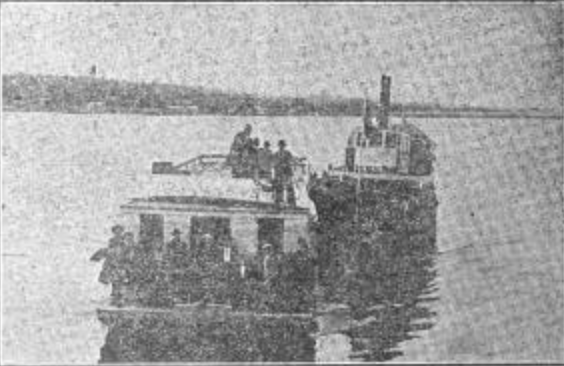
T.M. Richardson, with passenger barge on Yaquina Bay, June 1907 or earlier. Gazelle replaced Richardson in 1907, doing the same work.

For most of the summer of 1907, T.M. Richardson, a Yaquina Bay passenger steamer, was out of operation undergoing repairs. Richardson had broken its propeller shaft. This was not the only time that Richardson had been out of service during the summer of 1907.

Richardson was replaced on the route by the gasoline launch Gazelle, which arrived at Yaquina Bay from Portland on Saturday, August 3, 1907. (Gazelle was also expected to be used on fishing expeditions in the open ocean off of Yaquina Bay.) According to a critic of the Richardson, the gasoline launches towed the "same old boathouse scow that the Richardson tows when it is able to navigate."

On Saturday, August 10, 1907, Gazelle was taken out across the Yaquina bar on two whale watching excursions, each time "loaded with passengers." Whales had been seen in the ocean off Nye Beach in the previous few days. Gazelle encountered ten whales, one of which rose about 25 rods ahead of Gazelle, but dove down again quickly so there was no collision with the vessel.

== Ferry service on the Columbia river ==
By late September 1907, Richardson had been returned to service on the run between Newport and Yaquina City, where it met the trains of the Corvallis and Eastern Railroad. Gazelle which had been towing the barge Elk and covering the trans-bay work for the Richardson, was transferred back to Portland, leaving Yaquina Bay on the morning of Tuesday, September 10, 1907. Gazelle was piloted on this trip by Capt. H.W. Scott. Gazelle had been heavily braced to handle the rough seas of the open ocean, but arrived safely in Astoria, Oregon the same day.

In October 1907 Gazelle took the place of the steam ferry Vancouver, running for a nearly a month between Hayden Island and north shore of the Columbia River at Clark County, Washington, while Vancouver was out for repairs. Captain Scott was still in command at this time.

== Return to Oregon coast service ==
In February 1909, it was reported that Gazelle had been reconfigured at the Graham shipyard to be a deep-sea fishing vessel. The rebuilt Gazelle was launched on the afternoon of February 16, 1909, and its owners planned to take it around to Yaquina Bay to operate as fishing smack during the spring and summer. Prior to this, Gazelle had been on the Portland-Vancouver route carrying freight.

Gazelle cleared the Astoria customs house on February 23, 1909, and was headed for Newport. Captain Vogt was then in command. The plan was to try Gazelle on the deep-sea fisheries off the course, with the first work being done on the halibut banks about 40 miles west of Yaquina Bay. Capt. Richard Obie would take charge of the vessel for this work. After that the intention was for Gazelle to work its way back to Astoria.

In April 1909, Gazelle, under Captain Boeth, was brought to the Coos Bay area to fish on the off shore banks between Coos Bay and Coquille. Captain Boeth intended to sell part of his catch to the local market, and would ship the rest inland on ice.

On December 4, 1909, the outbound steamship Yellowstone encountered Gazelle in distress off the mouth of the Columbia River and towed it back inside. Gazelle had been traveling from Newport to Astoria, Oregon when it had an engine failure.

== Rammed and sunk ==
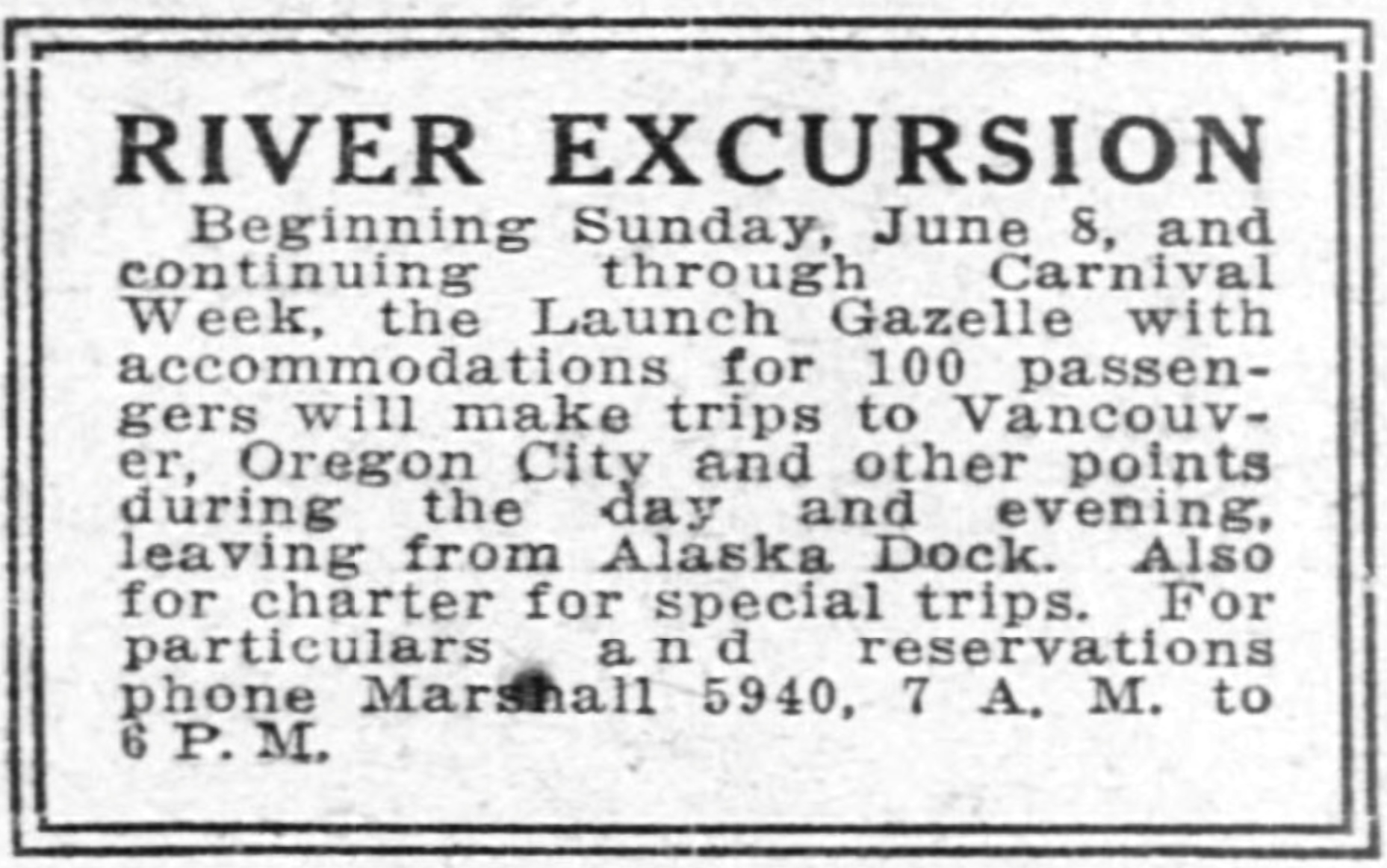
Advertisement for excursions on Gazelle, placed June 12, 1913

During the night of July 20–21, 1910, while Gazelle was moored at Vancouver, Washington, it was rammed during the night by another vessel. As a result, Gazelle sank, leaving the pilot house above the surface of the water. The name of the other vessel was not disclosed in the initial report. Gazelle was then valued at about $4,000 and was owned by the Scott brothers. Following the sinking, the tug Alarm was placed alongside Gazelle. Gazelle was thought likely to be raised and returned to service.

== Later excursion work ==
In June 1913, Gazelle was engaged in excursion work to Oregon City, Vancouver, and other points during the Portland Rose Festival, carrying up to 100 passengers at a time.

== Disposition ==
Gazelle was abandoned in 1929.
