= E-Stewards =

American electronics waste recycling standard

e-Stewards
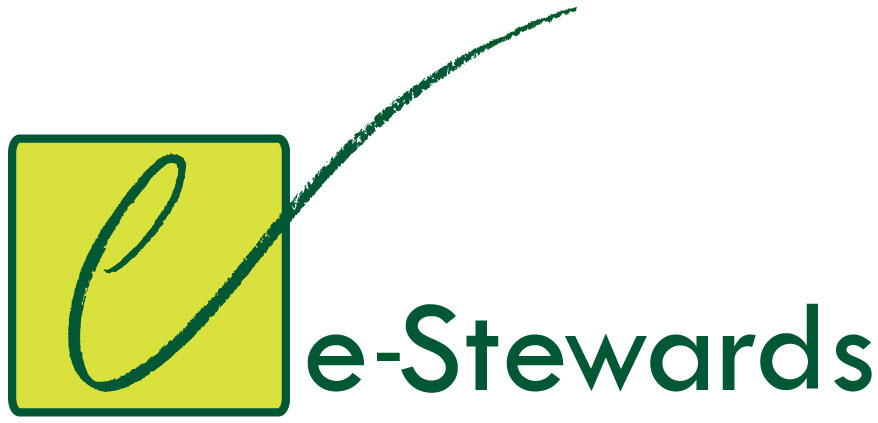
- Founded: 2003
- Type: Non-governmental organization, environmental organization
- Purpose: Electronics Waste (ewaste) Recycling Certification
- Location: Seattle, Washington, United States
- Key people: Jim Puckett
- Website: www.e-stewards.org

The e-Stewards Initiative is an electronics waste recycling standard created by the Basel Action Network.

The program and the organization that created it grew out of the concern that electronic waste generated in wealthy countries was being dismantled in poor countries, often by underage workers. The young workers were being exposed to toxic metals and working in unsafe conditions.

In 2009, BAN published the e-Stewards Standard for Responsible Recycling and Reuse of Electronic Equipment which set forth requirements for becoming a Certified e-Stewards Recycler—a program that "recognizes electronics recyclers that adhere to the most stringent environmentally and socially responsible practices when recovering hazardous electronic materials." Recyclers that were qualified under the older Pledge program had until 1 September 2011 to achieve certification to the Standard by an e-Stewards Accredited Certification Body accredited by ANAB (ANSI-ASQ National Accreditation Board).

== Standard ==
The e-Stewards Standard for Responsible Recycling and Reuse of Electronic Equipment was developed by the Basel Action Network. It is an industry-specific environmental management system standard that is the basis for the e-Stewards Initiative. On 6 March 2012, BAN released and updated revised Version 2.0 to open public comment prior to its final adoption later in the spring of 2012.

The certification is available to all electronics recyclers and refurbishers. To achieve an e-Stewards certification organizations are subject to an initial Stage I and Stage II audit. After passing such audits and being accepted by BAN, yearly surveillance audits take place to ensure organizations with the standard and have a registered ISO 14001 environmental management system in place, as well as achieving numerous performance requirements including assuring no export of hazardous electronic wastes to developing countries, no use of prison labor and no dumping of toxic materials in municipal landfills.

== See also ==
- Basel Convention
- Electronic waste
- Electronic waste by country
- ISO 14001
- E-Cycling
- Digger gold
- Hazardous waste
