= Chankalun =

Hong Kong artist

- Born: 31 July 1988 (age 37); Hong Kong
- Website: https://theneongirl.com/

Karen Chan (born July 31, 1988), known by her artist name Chankalun, is a neon artist, set designer, exhibition designer, and a visual artist. She is among the few neon practitioners in Hong Kong.

In 2018, she established Ceekayello, a Hong Kong–based art-design studio focused on exhibition and art-related projects, and in 2019, she founded HKCRAFTS, a non-profit arts organization that promotes and preserves Hong Kong culture and heritage.

== Life and career ==
=== Early life and education ===
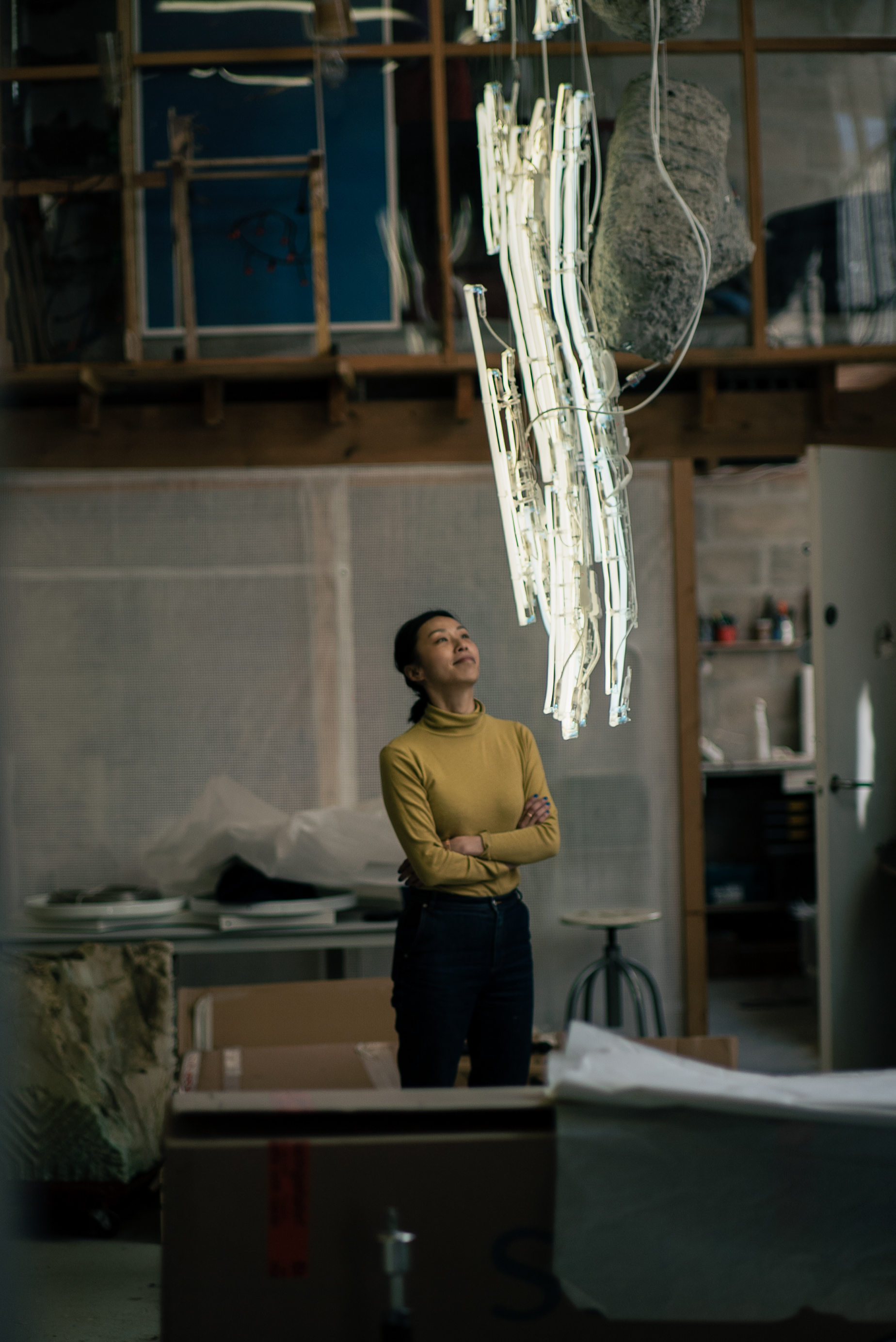
Chankalun looking at her piece "Courants", at POUSH artistic incubator, Paris

Chankalun was born in Hong Kong in 1988. She studied in the UK at Headington School and in New York and Paris at Parsons School of Design. In 2025, she has also joined Parsons Paris as their teaching faculty in Art Media, and Technology (BFA).

=== Supporting traditional handicrafts ===
In 2019, she took an interest in disappearing trades and crafts from Hong Kong, such as birdcage making and mahjong tile carving, and then founded HKCRAFTS, a non-governmental organization that hosts workshops to promote fading traditions.

In 2020, Chankalun organized an exhibition in a moving tram from Hong Kong Tramways, with the stated aim to pay tribute to traditional handicrafts.

[...] this project aims to raise awareness for the necessity and importance in preserving our city’s fast-disappearing traditional craftsmanship and encourage the passing of treasured skills to the younger generation.

— First Initiative Foundation (FIF)

=== Neon-making ===
Chankalun focuses on experimental neon-crafting techniques, influenced by her international education and mentors. She was the apprentice of Dutch neon artist Remy de Feyter and Hong Kong neon bender Master Wong Kin-wah, one of Hong Kong's last original neon makers.

Chankalun started neon crafting in order to preserve this dying craft and elevate it to suit modern-day sensibilities. Many streets of Hong Kong that used to be full of neon had already been stripped bare or replaced by LEDs and Chankalun saw a need for a concerted effort to preserve and evolve the craft. She hopes to reconstruct Hong Kong's neon ecosystem.

Her works have been published in the book "Collected Light Volume 2: Women Light Artists", "a collection of art that uses light as its main medium from 44 more female artists from around the world" published by Light Collective and "Neon Is Not Dead: The Future of a Hong Kong Icon" published by Zolima Culture Guide.

=== Advocacy ===
Commissioned by Swiss luxury cosmetic brand La Prairie, Chankalun produced in early 2023 several art installations, including a large-scale art installation, named Light as Air, inspired by the natural landscape of Montreux. It has been exhibited during Art Basel Hong Kong at Tai Kwun Parade Ground, a prominent outdoor location on Hong Kong Island. In her constant effort to produce eco-friendly installations, Chankalun used up-cycled glass, as well as La Prairie's White Caviar waste materials.

Her neon light installation made from recycled neon glass is an embodiment of heritage preservation with sustainable sensibilities.

— Nat Geo Asia

Chankalun has given talks on neon craftsmanship and cultural preservation at TEDxTinHauWomen, Apple’s “Today at Apple” series in Hong Kong, and the Art Institute of Chicago. She has also led educational workshops at M+ Museum.

== Awards ==
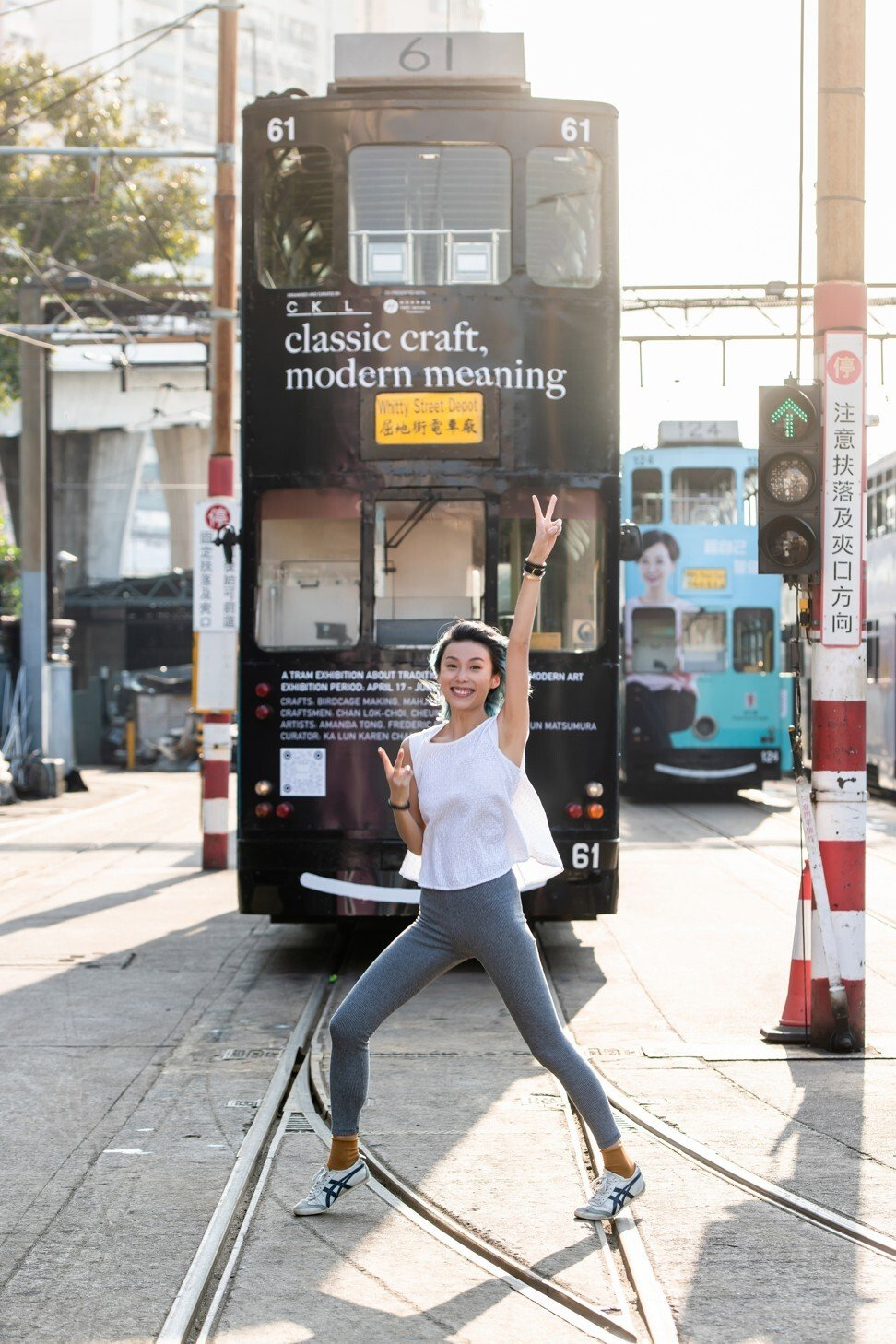
Chankalun in front of her tram for the exhibition Classic Craft, Modern Meaning

Classic Craft, Modern Meaning exhibition created by Chankalun about local crafts and hosted in a moving tram from Hong Kong, received a gold award in Sky Design awards

Haiijaii, (meaning breathe in Thai), a light installation exhibited at Wonderfruit festival and fueled by data of air quality index collected from various locations around the world, won bronze Sky Design awards. The project was carried out by neon artist Chankalun, curator Adulaya Kim Hoontrakul, visual artist Frédéric Bussière and multimedia designer Santipab Somboon.

Light as Air, commissioned by La Prairie for Art Basel Hong Kong 2023 at Tai Kwun has received the prestigious LIT Lighting Design Awards in the "Entertainment Light Design", notably, as the only winner from Hong Kong in this category, for both the "Outdoor Light Art Installation" and "Conceptual Lighting Installation" subcategories.
