= Recommerce =

Reselling used products

Recommerce or reverse commerce, is the selling of previously owned, new or used products, mainly electronic devices or media such as books, through physical or online distribution channels to buyers who repair, if necessary, then reuse, recycle or resell them. Recommerce allows for the item to have a second life with a new owner instead for it to be thrown out and left to be forgotten.

== History of the term ==
In February 2005, George F. Colony, the head of Forrester Research introduced the term recommerce in response to a question about the technology spending trends after the Dot-com bubble: "There's a lot of shelf-life issues out there. People are a couple of releases behind. Older PCs. There is a move to really go back to — we call it 'recommerce'. Instead of 'ecommerce', it's 'recommerce'". He said.

The term is now primarily used to describe businesses that resell used goods. Most of them focus on consumer electronics, such as smartphones, tablets, and notebooks. Physical media, such as books, DVDs, and Blu-ray discs are also significant.

While there have long been channels for selling used goods, such as garage sales and flea markets, online platforms such as eBay or craigslist allow individuals to sell used goods much more efficiently.

Beginning in the early 2000s, companies that professionalized the industry by offering professional buyback or trade-in schemes started to thrive: consumers could sell their old smartphones, TVs, or computers to offset the cost of a new one. This has been common practice with car sales for decades.

Companies such as Gazelle, Rebag, and ThredUp started in the 2000s to offer purchasing and trade-in services completely separate from the purchase of new items and further spread the term. Soon after this, companies like SmartphonesPLUS, Amazon, and Walmart started their own trade-in programs.

== Recommerce types ==
=== Informal market ===
Consumers who sell used goods directly person to person (such as flea markets, garage sales or ad hoc) or via Marketplaces such as Amazon or eBay. Hereby some platforms such as eBay may hedge the risk of the payment for the consumer by providing payment tools such as PayPal or just offer the possibility to market the product such as craigslist. This method allows for users to give items like clothes a second chance in life and help to not contribute towards fast fashion or let clothes go to waste.

=== Trade-In and recommerce services ===
An increasing amount of transactions occur directly via specialized service companies that purchase used goods, refurbish them if necessary and resell them subsequently. Such platforms often provide initial indications of the final purchase price for the good.

Most platforms assist the user during the transaction by offering the following services:

- An indication of the final purchase price to the owner of the product sold (often the final price varies as the consumer cannot verify to the full extend all determining factors of the product sold such as the quality of the battery of a smartphone during the process);
- By organizing the logistical return of the product;
- By controlling the product's condition in a specialized workshop;
- By recycling the good if it can't be used anymore.

This kind of resale allows sellers to overcome some marketplaces drawbacks, by providing a means of simplified acquisition, and immediate and sometimes guaranteed value.

=== Buy back and trade-in offers by vendors of new products ===
Especially in the electronics sector the purchase and buyback of consumer electronics became very common in recent years. By today all major MNO offer Trade-In solutions combined or detached from the purchase of a new phone. Most of this services are offered by 3rd party refurbishing companies specialised in used electronics.

Mobile Operator	Offers Trade-In / Buy Back
AT&T	Yes, all major brands
T-Mobile	Yes, all major brands
Verizon	Yes, all major brands
Sprint	Yes, all major brands

== Types of purchased products ==
Examples of the main assets of companies acquired by recommerce include:

- Consumer non-durables: disposable razors, jeans, corks, pantyhose, eyeglasses, watches
- Cultural goods: books, CDs, DVDs
- Jewelry: gold, silver
- Technological devices: cellphones, smartphones, tablet computers, TVs, video game consoles, GPS devices, cameras, video cameras
- Clothes & unwanted fashion items and accessories; handbags, small goods
- Over the counter (OTC) medical supplies, particularly Diabetes testing supplies such as glucose test strips and lancets

Many ecommerce services have introduced recommerce solutions, including distributors, online retailers, and chain retailers.

== The various marketing positions recommerce ==
Multiple types of recommerce services are available:

- Recommerce, used as a method of funding, which can compensate the seller in cash or with a voucher.
- Solidarity recommerce, the return of products by offering its holders an opportunity to share or redistribute the residual value with a non-profit organization or a social cause (e.g., micro-credit, or insertion).
- Ecological recommerce, the recycling or proper disposal of products with strong polluting capacity (providing repair or recycling regulatory compliance).

== Positive impact of recommerce ==
=== Environment ===
Environmental reports by electronics manufactures show that the majority of natural resources for the production of such products are consumed during manufacturing and first transport of the product and not during the use of a product. In many cases the reuse of such a good is significantly more beneficial than the pure recycling as eventual logistics and energy consumptions during the recycling don't occur and a used product can be resold instead of a new product being produced. The reuse of a product is an effective means of reducing products' environmental footprint.

Smartphone	Production	Logistics	Use	Recycling	Total Emissions
iPhone 6	85%	3%	11%	1%	95 kg CO2e

=== Consumer Purchase Power ===
The product holder increases its purchasing power to acquire a new product by selling back its old one.

== Factors influencing recommerce development ==
Several factors have greatly accelerated the development of recommerce in developed countries, including:

- The demand for solutions enabling consumers to separate themselves ethically from their products,
- The ease of use of recommerce services, and more importantly,
- The preponderance of takeover bids, which handsomely compensate the owners of recommerce services.

In France, the rise of recommerce is partly supported by the "Grenelle II" Law, which states that when they are sold under the brand name of a single dealer, it must "provide or contribute to the collection, removal and treatment of electrical and electronic equipment waste instead of the person who manufactures, imports or brings in the domestic market (...) this equipment regardless of the selling technique, including distance selling and electronic sales".

== Recommerce issues ==
Recommerce requires a special organization of many functions, such as: logistics management, information systems, customer relations, price control and treatment of the product in the shop, promotion, retention, and resale. Functional products recovered via recommerce solutions are usually put back on the market by the recommercer. Moreover, when this product exceeds local demand, recommercers sometimes turn to foreign markets to sell the products they have purchased. Thus, the recommercer sells some of these used functional products in emerging markets where access to technology and accelerating economic development are reserved for some part of the population.

== See also ==
=== Related articles ===
- E-commerce
- Recycling
- Reuse
- Trade in services
- Waste Management
- Reseller
- Used good
- Sustainability
