= NextWorth =

Electronics trade-in and recycling service

- Type: Private
- Founded: 2005; 21 years ago
- Defunct: August 2021
- Fate: Dissolved
- Headquarters: Billerica, Massachusetts, United States
- Key people: David Chen, CEO
- Services: Used electronics trade-ins
- Revenue: $31.4 million (2012)
- Website: nextworth.com

NextWorth Solutions, Inc., was an electronics trade-in and recycling service. Users of the service exchange used electronics for cash or discounts on newer models. NextWorth was founded by business students at Babson College in 2005. It started as a commission-based service to help businesses setup online auctions for their used items, then changed its business model to focus on electronics trade-ins in 2006. As of late 2012, NextWorth was one of the best-known and largest electronics trade-in and recycling services in the United States, although it handles only a small percentage of total trade-in traffic.

The Massachusetts Secretary of the Commonwealth had signed the company's certificate of dissolution in June 2019. Although the company seemed to operate in some capacity for the next two years, NextWorth's website went dark in August 2021.

== History ==
NextWorth was founded by David Chen, Andrew Walsh and Scott Richardson while they were students at Babson College. The company was selected for Babson College's 2005 Business Hatcheries program, which provides free resources to student-led startups. NextWorth Inc. began operations the following year. It was originally a service that helped businesses and non-profits prepare luxury items for online auctions in exchange for a 20-33 percent commission. In the spring of 2006, NextWorth changed its business model and services to focus on electronics trade-ins. In January 2007, NextWorth raised $1.5 million in its first round of funding.

== Services ==
NextWorth purchases used electronics and resells about 80-85 percent of them, while the remainder are sent to a network of partners for recycling. Many used iPhones are resold in countries where new ones are more expensive. Sellers can fill out an online form to describe the used products they want to sell, then get a quote through the website. After receiving the quote, sellers have thirty days to ship the product using a pre-paid shipping label provided by NextWorth. The company wipes the device's memory and inspects the item before sending the seller reimbursement in 3–15 days depending on the payment method. If NextWorth appraises a product at a lower condition than the seller expected, they can get an explanation from NextWorth, challenge the quote, or reject it and get the product back.

Sellers can also do trade-ins in-person and get reimbursed immediately at partnered retailers like Target. The Target trade-in program began as a pilot project in 2009, and expanded to 190 locations by 2010 and almost 1,500 stores by 2011. Their partnership with Target ended in late 2016 when Target selected CExchange as their new partner. A similar partnership was in place with Circuit City before it went out of business in 2009. A company spokesperson stated in 2009 that the company was also partnered with 15 smaller retailers for in-person trade-ins.

== Pricing ==
NextWorth sets its prices through an algorithm developed by MBA students and a professor at Babson College. Sellers can obtain better prices by reselling their electronics directly through services like eBay or Craigslist, but services like NextWorth are more convenient and have predictable pricing. A CNET editor found most of the trade-in prices at NextWorth to be "pretty fair", though he was expecting higher prices for some items. Variations in price between trade-in services and products depend on timing (release of new models and market fluctuations), the model being sold, and the product's condition.

According to About.com, how fair the seller is in describing the condition of the product "will determine whether your experience with NextWorth is satisfying or not." Some sellers get higher or lower prices than they were originally quoted, depending on how NextWorth's assessment of the product's condition compares to the seller's description.

NextWorth had experienced spikes in trade-in activity from sellers when some newer models are announced, such as when the iPad 2 was announced in March 2011, and when the iPhone 5 was announced in September 2012 These announcements also caused the trade-in price of older models to decrease, due to over-supply. as well as after the holiday season.
