= Texas Campaign for the Environment =

U.S. non-profit organization

- Nickname: TCE
- Formation: 1991
- Tax ID no.: 74-2891025
- Legal status: 501(c)(4)
- Purpose: Grassroots environmental organizing
- Headquarters: Austin, Texas
- Locations: Dallas, Texas; Houston, Texas; Corpus Christi, Texas
- Region served: Texas
- Executive Director: Robin Schneider
- Website: www.texasenvironment.org

Texas Campaign for the Environment (TCE) is a grassroots advocacy 501(c)(4) non-profit organization that works on health and environmental issues in the state of Texas in the United States. TCE began when its founders parted ways with Texans United in 1991. The organization has offices in Dallas, Austin, Houston, and Corpus Christi.

TCE worked with others in closing the grandfather loophole in the Texas Clean Air Act, requiring older industrial facilities to install modern pollution control systems. Currently focused on waste and recycling issues, TCE has organized communities near landfills and trash facilities to oppose major expansions and advocate for increased recycling programs in Texas. TCE is working to implement Zero waste strategies and is a member of the Central Texas Zero Waste Alliance.

TCE has a special focus on electronic waste and its negative effects in Texas, the U.S. and worldwide, and is a leading member of the Electronics TakeBack Coalition . In 2007, TCE was part of a coalition of environmental groups, local governments, electronics producers, and recyclers that resulted in the passage of producer takeback recycling (also known as extended producer responsibility) legislation in Texas. House Bill 2714 was unanimously passed and signed into law by Governor Rick Perry on June 17, 2007. This law requires all computer companies who wish to sell their products in the state to develop convenient, free recycling programs for their consumers. TCE then worked to pass a similar bill that would require television companies to take back and recycle their obsolete products as well. This legislation passed but was vetoed by Governor Rick Perry. As of 2010, TCE is working to pass national legislation to restrict the exportation of toxic electronic waste to developing countries overseas. The organization is currently headed by Robin Schneider, who has been featured in several books on electronic waste such as Challenging the Chip.

TCE was a vocal force in Houston's negotiation of a new recycling contract, helping secure glass and single-use plastic bags as part of Houston's move to single-stream recycling.

The primary tool of TCE is canvassing. Five to six days a week, TCE organizers head out into Texas residential areas and go door-to-door educating citizens on current issues and getting them involved by collecting membership contributions and having them write letters to corporate, federal, state and local figures.

== See also ==
- Green computing
- Computer recycling
- Electronic waste
- Zero waste
