= Metech Incorporated =

Metech Recycling, Inc.
- Company type: Privately held company
- Industry: IT Asset Management (ITAM), IT Asset Disposition (ITAD), Electronics Recycling, HIPAA Compliant Medical Device Recycling, Precious Metal Recovery (Electronics Recycling)
- Founded: 1968
- Headquarters: Gilroy, California, Clinton, Massachusetts; Denver, Colorado; Salt Lake City, Utah; Roxboro, North Carolina
- Key people: Rex Cheng, President; Robert Laughlin, Vice President of Sales; Rong Mei, CFO; Nicole Palacio, Director of Operations
- Products: IT & Computer Related Hardware, Base Metals, Plastics, Precious Metals
- Number of employees: 50-75
- Parent: First America Management Group
- Website: metechrecycling.com

METech Recycling, Inc. traces its roots to 1875 and has been recovering value from electronic materials since the early days of the industry, making it one of the longest-standing electronics recyclers in the United States. The company is headquartered in Gilroy, California, and operates five R2v3-certified recycling facilities across the country, including locations in Denver, Colorado; Worcester, Massachusetts; Roxboro, North Carolina; and Salt Lake City, Utah. The company was founded to recycle precious metal scrap from electronic equipment manufacturers. Over time, they transitioned to recycle electronic components and manufacturing by-products. Over the years, end-of-life electronic equipment, brand, proprietary design, HIPAA and all government compliance protection, secure data destruction and asset management have become the core focus as the business landscape continues to change. The company places an emphasis on environmentally responsible recycling.

== History ==
Metech History Timeline

1875
The Wildberg Brothers facility, (aka Boliden Metech), was a metal reclamation plant which operated in San Francisco between 1907 and 1986. The site was approximately 5 1/2 acres in size. This facility was used as an antimony smelting plant which operated for an unknown duration beginning in 1875.

1907
The Site was purchased in 1907 by the Wildberg Brothers Company who operated a metal reclamation facility. The operations included milling, sampling, assaying of scrap materials, electrolytic deposition of silver, stripping of gold, and copper concentration. Gold, platinum, palladium, silver and copper were recovered as finished products.

1968
RMI traces its origin back to 1968 in Woonsocket, Rhode Island. At that time, Refinemet focused on precious metals and tantalum recovery. Refinemet expanded into electronics recycling by “default” in the late ’70s and early ’80s because customers like AT&T, Burroughs, DEC and IBM had large pieces of equipment that they were retiring.

1980
Wildberg Brothers sold the facility to Refinemet International (RMI) in 1980. RMI primarily used the facility for precious metal scrap processing and refining.

1983
In 1983, shortly after expanding into processing end-of-life electronics, Boliden, a smelting and mining company based in Stockholm, Sweden, purchased RMI and renamed it Boliden Metech. It was during this time that Metech moved the East Coast operation from Woonsocket, RI to Mapleville, RI. Boliden used the San Francisco facility primarily for precious metal scrap processing but did not engage in refining operations at the Site. Operations conducted onsite consisted of material sorting, sampling, and assaying before the materials were containerized for shipment to Boliden facilities overseas for processing.

1986
Boliden discontinued all operations at the San Francisco site in May 1986. All buildings at the site, with the exception of Building 1, the Office Building, Building 2, the Laboratory; and Buildings 11–12, the Melt Shop, and Mechanical Processing area, were demolished and the business was moved to our current location in Gilroy, CA. Trelleborg, (the parent company of Boliden), later spun off the smelting operations under the name Boliden but retained Metech as a recycling and processing operation. In 2002 Viking Investment and Asset Management, based in Johannesburg, South Africa, bought Metech.

2005
In 2005 Metech was acquired by MTI Corp and relocated the corporate offices from Mapleville, RI to Worcester, Mass. The company designed a processing line to include shredders and downstream separation equipment. At this time, Metech also discontinued receiving precious-metals-containing hazardous waste and scaled back its other local precious metals refining businesses that were not adding value to the company's focus on integrated electronics recycling.

2007
In 2007 Metech was acquired by “Centillion Environment and Recycling Ltd” of Singapore. In 2008 Centillion purchases “Guaranteed Recycling Xperts” (GRX) with locations in Denver, CO, Salt Lake City, UT and Omaha, NE.

2009
2009 Centillion merges Metech and GRX under the Metech Recycling banner. In 2012 Centillion was renamed Metech International

2016
In 2016 the Worcester facility was relocated once more to its current location in nearby Clinton, MA. At this time, corporate operations were permanently transferred to the Gilroy, CA facility.

2018
In 2018 Metech Recycling was purchased from METech International Pte by First America Management Group and taken Private.

2021
The METech Creedmoor location relocates to Roxboro, NC.

METech continues to operate with a strong national footprint serving industries across the United States in industries such as medical, military, government, education, and manufacturing.

== See also ==
- IT Asset Management
- Data security
- Data erasure
- Computer Recycling
- Electronic waste
- Electronic devices
