= Crutchfield Corporation =

Electronics retailer

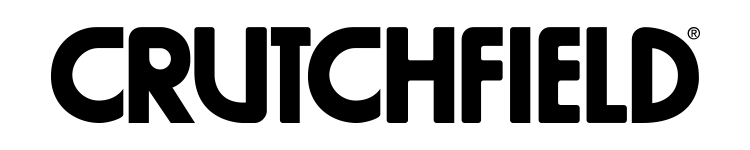
- Company type: Private
- Industry: Consumer electronics retail
- Founded: 1974
- Founder: William G. Crutchfield, Jr.
- Headquarters: Charlottesville, Virginia
- Key people: Bill Crutchfield, CEO
- Number of employees: 600
- Website: www.Crutchfield.com

Crutchfield Corporation is an American retailer of electronics, including mobile audio and video equipment, along with other electronics for home or portable use. Founded in 1974 by William G. "Bill" Crutchfield, Jr., the company is based in Charlottesville, Virginia.

== History ==
Crutchfield was founded in 1974 by Bill Crutchfield. He used a $25,000 line of credit and started the company from his mother's basement. He was inspired by not finding a modern day stereo to fit in an old vehicle he was restoring and launched Crutchfield as the first car audio mail order catalogue.

Company headquarters were built near the Charlottesville–Albemarle Airport and opened in 1979.

In the 1980s the company experienced a significant drop in profits, with the company's income briefly becoming negative in 1983.

By 2007, it had expanded to 675 employees and locations in Virginia and Canada.
