= Telco-OTT =

Telco-OTT (Over-The-Top) is where a telecommunications service provider delivers one or more services across an IP network. The IP networks is predominantly the public internet although sometimes telco cloud run services delivered via a corporation's existing IP-VPN from another provider, as opposed to the carrier's own access network. It embraces a variety of telco services including communications (e.g. voice and messaging), content (e.g. TV and music) and cloud-based (e.g. compute and storage) offerings.

Stimulated by the availability of high performance fixed and mobile broadband networks as well as the rapid adoption of smartphones and tablet computers, telco-OTT is viewed by a selection of industry analysts and media commentators as the mechanism that mobile network operators need to employ in order to compete with the vast and growing range of over-the-top (OTT) services provided by non-telco companies.

Telco-OTT is a response to the fact that users will have multiple devices (smartphones, laptops or other connected devices such as TVs, games consoles) which almost inevitably will have various different access providers (especially with the growth of public-access Wi-Fi). So to deliver consistent telco-branded services, at some points at least, they will need to be delivered over 3rd-party access.

The term was first coined by telecoms industry analyst Dean Bubley who first published a report on it in February 2012, but first used the term in a June 2011 presentation he gave at the eComm conference in SF.

== Resources ==
- Analysys Mason: "Telco OTT service case studies: next-generation mobile voice and messaging" (6 September 2012)
- Disruptive Analysis: "Telco-OTT Strategies & Case Studies: 'Give it a name!': The overlooked rise of telecom operators' own access-independent Internet services, for communications, content, cloud & connectivity" (February 2012)
- Martin Geddes Consulting: "Introduction to Telco-OTT Services" (3 May 2012)
- Ovum: "Mobile Operator Strategies for Defending Against OTT Competition" (12 September 2012)
- Telco-OTT Today
- Amazon Prime Statistics
- A few myths about telco and OTT models
- "How Mobile OTT is Ruling over Telco Operator" (June 15, 2017)
