= Venrock =

American venture capital firm

Venrock Management, LLC
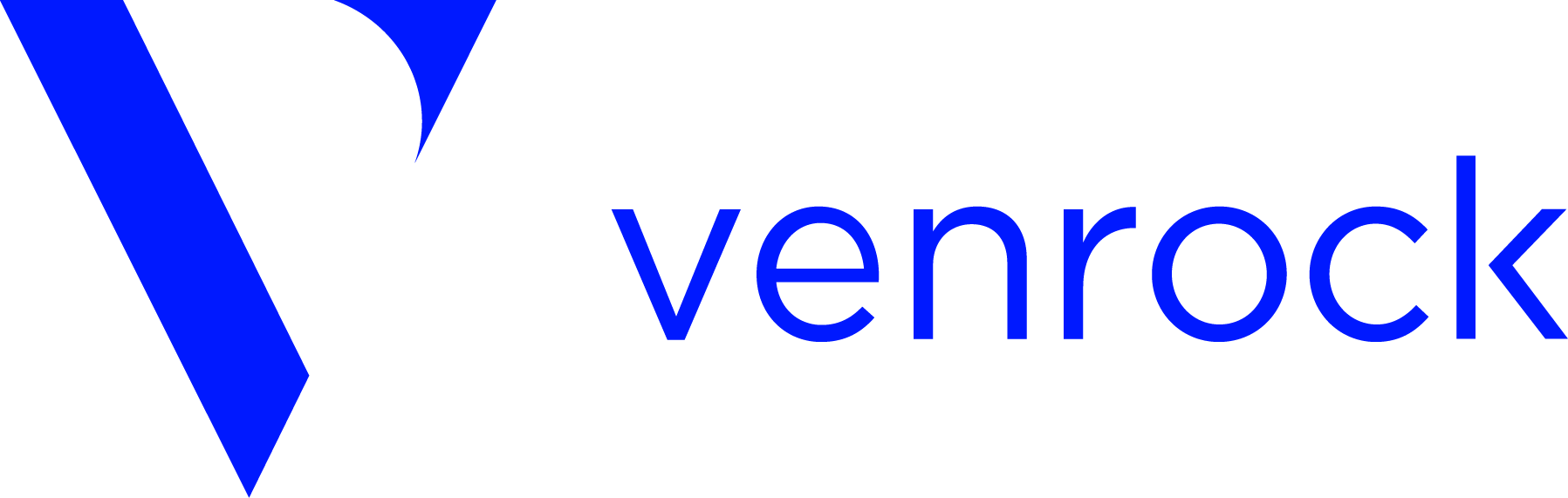
- Venrock logo
- Type: Limited liability company
- Industry: Venture capital
- Founded: 1969; 57 years ago
- Founder: Laurance Rockefeller
- Headquarters: Palo Alto, California, United States
- Products: Investments
- Website: venrock.com

Venrock (portmanteau of Venture and Rockefeller) is an American venture capital firm formed in 1969 to build upon the successful investing activities of the Rockefeller family that began in the late 1930s. It has offices in Palo Alto, California, and New York City.

== History ==
Beginning in 1934, Laurance S. Rockefeller (1910–2004) the fourth of the six children of John D. Rockefeller Jr. began investing in early-stage businesses. The first was a store that sold Finnish furniture. The second, borne of his friendship with the pilot Eddie Rickenbacker, led to the creation of Eastern Airlines.

He continued investing portions of his family’s fortune and ultimately grew roughly $8.7 million into more than $28 million by the late 1950s. After identifying an early-stage opportunity, he would occasionally bring his brothers and sister in as partners. Using his wealth to seed start-up ventures was a relatively unknown practice at the time.

In 1969, Rockefeller formalized these activities by establishing Venrock Associates as a limited partnership funded by family members and some of the institutions the family supported including the Museum of Modern Art, Rockefeller University and Memorial Sloan-Kettering Cancer Center. By 1996, Venrock had financed 221 early-stage companies across aviation, electronics, computers, and biotechnology. Some of its earliest investments include Intel, Apple, 3Com and Gilead Sciences.

Venrock closed its seventh fund in July 2014 with 8 partners and its eighth fund in January 2017 with 15 partners, each fund totalling $450 million.

== Investments ==
Venrock invested more than $2.5 billion in more than 440 companies, resulting in 125 initial public offerings. Venrock focuses its investments on early-stage and start-up companies in information technology, healthcare and emerging technologies. These include: Intel, Apple, AppNexus, Astranis, StrataCom, Check Point Software, Dapper Labs, DoubleClick, 3Com Corporation, Mosaic, PGP, Itek, Digex, Interos, Shape Security, Phoenix, Second Rotation (gazelle), RedSeal, CTERA Networks, and Juno Therapeutics. It also has a significant venture in the nascent nanotechnology field, with early funding of Nanosys and the nanotech division of Du Pont. Others include BioTime.

In the healthcare sector with partners such as Bryan Roberts, Venrock has invested in athenahealth, Grand Rounds, HealthSouth Corporation, MedPartners, Inc., Castlight Health, Caliper Technologies Corporation, Centocor, Geron, senolytic startup UNITY Biotechnology, Genetics Institute, Idec Pharmaceuticals Corporation, Illumina, Millennium Pharmaceuticals, Sirna Therapeutics, and Sugen.

== See also ==
- Nanotechnology
- List of venture capital firms
