= HMS Gazelle =

Minesweeper of the Royal Navy

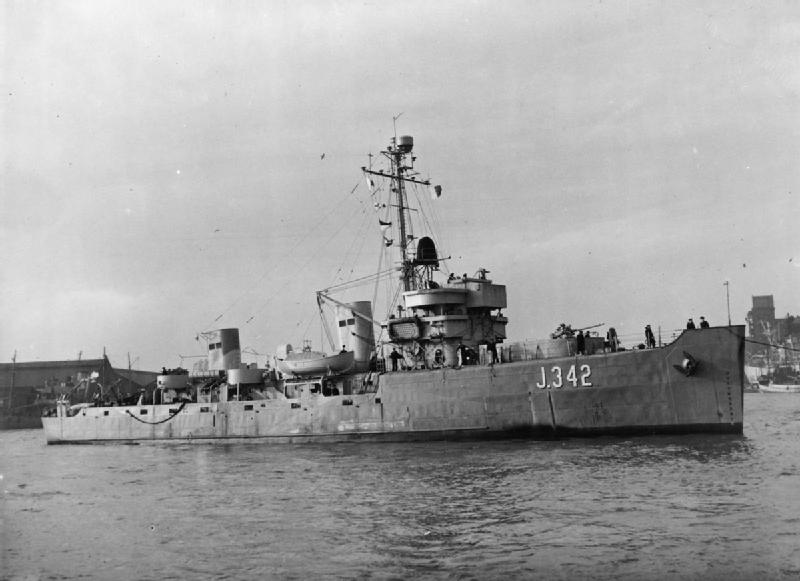

History

United Kingdom
- Name: HMS Gazelle (J342)
- Namesake: Gazelle
- Builder: Savannah Machinery and Foundry Co.
- Laid down: 2 July 1942 as BAM-17
- Launched: 10 January 1943
- Commissioned: 28 July 1943 as HMS Gazelle (J342)
- Out of service: December 1946
- Fate: Returned to the United States Navy

General characteristics
- Class & type: Catherine-class minesweeper
- Displacement: 890 tons
- Length: 221 ft 3 in (67.44 m)
- Beam: 32 ft (9.8 m)
- Draft: 10 ft 9 in (3.28 m)
- Propulsion: Two 1,710shp Cooper Bessemer GSB-8 diesel engines
- Speed: 18 kts
- Complement: 105
- Armament: One 3"/50 dual purpose gun mount, two twin 40mm gun mounts, two 20mm gun mounts, two depth charge tracks, five depth charge projectors

HMS Gazelle was a Catherine-class minesweeper of the Royal Navy (the Catherine class was the British designation for the United States Navy's Auk-class minesweepers).

In May 1945, as the war drew to a close, a flotilla of eight minesweepers including Gazelle took part in "Operation Cleaver" to clear the German mine barrage off the Skagerrak, making way for a squadron led by the light cruisers Birmingham and Dido with four destroyers to return the Danish government-in-exile to Copenhagen and take the surrender of German warships in Danish waters. The force reached Copenhagen on 9 May, taking control of the German cruisers Prinz Eugen and Nürnberg after their surrender.
