= Gazelle (recycling company) =

ecoATM, LLC
- Type: Private
- Industry: eCommerce
- Founded: Boston, Massachusetts (2006)
- Founder: Israel Ganot; Rousseau Aurelien; James McElhiney
- Headquarters: San Diego, CA, United States
- Number of locations: San Diego, CA; Louisville, KY
- Key people: Chris Sullivan (CEO); Sarah Welch (CMO); Ben Katz (CTO)
- Revenue: $100+ Million (2013)
- Website: www.gazelle.com

ecoATM, LLC, doing business as Gazelle, is an e-commerce company founded in 2006 that recycles used electronic devices, such as mobile phones and tablet and laptop computers. It is headquartered in San Diego, California with operations in Louisville, Kentucky.

== History ==
Gazelle was founded in 2006 by Israel Ganot, Rousseau Aurelien, and James McElhiney. The company launched Gazelle.com launched in 2008 and secured $46 million in funding from investors including Venrock, Rockport Capital, Physic Ventures and Craton Equity Partners.

The company's corporate office is located in San Diego, California, and employs over 150 people. In June 2013, Gazelle opened its first processing center in Louisville, Kentucky, which operates with approximately 150 employees. In 2013, the company reached over $100 million in revenue, with an annual growth rate of 80 percent.

In November 2014, Gazelle launched a store offering certified pre-owned devices directly to consumers.

By late 2014, Gazelle had paid $200 million to consumers for used devices and had processed over 2 million devices from more than 1 million customers.

On November 10, 2015, Gazelle was officially acquired by Outerwall Inc., the owner of ecoATM, another electronics recycling company.

In December 2020, Gazelle announced that it would be shutting down its trade-in program effective February 1, 2021.; the company reversed this decision two months later.

== Recognition and awards ==
- Gazelle reached its two millionth device milestone in May 2014.
- In 2012, Gazelle ranked within the Inc. 500 Fastest Growing Companies for three years in a row.
- In 2012, Gazelle ranked as #97 the Top 100 Consumer Products & Services Companies, #16 in the Top 100 Massachusetts Companies, and #15 in the Boston Metro Area.

== See also ==
- Electronic waste in the United States
