= Electronic waste in Guiyu =

Largest e-waste site in the world, in Guangdong Province, China

Guiyu (Chinese: 贵屿), in Guangdong Province, China, was once the largest electronic waste (e-waste) site in the world. In 2005, there were 60,000 e-waste workers in Guiyu who processed the more than 100 truckloads that were transported to the 52-square-kilometre area every day. The constant movement into and processing of e-wastes in the area leading to the harmful and toxic environment and living conditions, coupled with inadequate facilities, led to the Guiyu town being nicknamed the "electronic graveyard of the world".

== Processing ==
Guiyu was once the largest e-waste recycling processing site in the world.

In 2005, there were 60,000 e-waste workers in Guiyu who processed the more than 100 truckloads that were transported to the 52-square-kilometre area every day. The constant movement into and processing of e-wastes in the area leading to the harmful and toxic environment and living conditions, coupled with inadequate facilities, have led to the Guiyu town being nicknamed the "electronic graveyard of the world".

The majority of the e-waste that was processed in Guiyu came from the wealthy countries in the Global North. The European Union has sanctions against exporting waste to developing countries, but those rules are aggressively ignored. Many waste goods are classed as "charitable donations" before they are dumped on scrap heaps. Similarly, Agbogbloshie, in Ghana, is another example of how thousands of tons of electronic waste from Europe is dumped in developing countries.

In 2005, there were 60,000 e-waste workers in Guiyu who processed the more than 100 truckloads that were transported to the 52-square-kilometre area every day. The constant movement into and processing of e-wastes in the area leading to the harmful and toxic environment and living conditions, coupled with inadequate facilities, have led to the Guiyu town being nicknamed the "electronic graveyard of the world".

== Political implications ==
The e-waste industry primarily comprised small family-owned businesses until the adoption of ecological civilization policies. These policies, rooted in ecological principles, were implemented by the Chinese Communist Party to restructure the industry in Guiyu. The Party's efforts aimed to centralize, formalize, and expand e-waste operations in the region. To achieve centralization, a recycling center was constructed for surveillance and control over workers. Formalization involved the purported automation of manual labor to legitimize the industry. Expansion strategies focused on consolidating state-sponsored companies instead of numerous small entities.

The CCP viewed the more adaptable 'informal' sector, capable of disassembling and recycling diverse electronic components, as unfair competition. Consequently, these informal businesses were outlawed and encouraged to rent workshops within the recycling center.

Despite the ban on imported foreign e-waste, such materials are present in the area. This is attributed to the involvement of criminal organizations facilitating their entry through Tianjin, and especially via Hong Kong. The profitability and community dependency on the industry contribute to this situation as well. However, domestically generated waste remains the predominant portion of the site. Additionally, restrictions were imposed on transporting e-waste exceeding three tonnes. This measure aimed to sustain small businesses while offering opportunities for expansion to state-sponsored enterprises.

== Health impacts ==
Once a rice village, the pollution has made Guiyu unable to produce crops for food and the water of the river is undrinkable. Many of the primitive recycling operations in Guiyu are toxic and dangerous to workers' health with 80% of children suffering from lead poisoning. Above-average miscarriage rates are also reported in the region. Workers use their bare hands to crack open electronics to strip away any parts that can be reused—including chips and valuable metals, such as gold, silver, etc. Workers also "cook" circuit boards to remove chips and solders, burn wires and other plastics to liberate metals such as copper; use highly corrosive and dangerous acid baths along the riverbanks to extract gold from the microchips; and sweep printer toner out of cartridges. Children are exposed to the dioxin-laden ash as the smoke billows around Guiyu, finally settling on the area. The soil surrounding these factories has been saturated with lead, chromium, tin, and other heavy metals. Discarded electronics lie in pools of toxins that leach into the groundwater, making the water undrinkable to the extent that water must be trucked in from elsewhere. Lead levels in the river sediment are double European safety levels, according to the Basel Action Network. Lead in the blood of Guiyu's children is 54% higher on average than that of children in the nearby town of Chendian. Piles of ash and plastic waste sit on the ground beside rice paddies and dikes holding in the Lianjiang River.

A 2008 study titled Heavy Metals Concentrations of Surface Dust from E-Waste Recycling, and Its Human Health Implications in Southeast China examined environmental and human health risks in Guiyu by collecting dust samples from workshops, roads, a schoolyard and an outdoor food market that sells fish, vegetables, and meat. The study found that in the workshops, there were elevated levels of lead, copper, and zinc; at a schoolyard, there were elevated levels of lead and copper. Other areas near the school also contained extremely high levels of nickel in areas where children often eat (and are therefore exposed to contaminated dust). High levels of copper, nickel, lead, and zinc were found in the food market. This was a concern because the food (often placed in plastic buckets on the ground) likely comes into contact with this contaminated dust. Lead and copper in road dust were 330 and 106, and 371 and 155 times higher, respectively than non-e-waste sites located 8 and 30 km away. High levels of toxic metals at the schoolyard and food market showed that public places were adversely impacted. Out of all the metals found, lead consistently had the greatest amounts present at all locations, with copper being the second most abundant. Levels of lead for a workshop employee exceeded the "safe" amount of oral lead ingestion by 50 times. Lead levels for the general public were 5 times lower than those for e-waste workers but were still higher than the "safe" amount. Children, who face great adverse effects from lead poisoning, face a potential health risk at all locations 8 times higher than adults. Studies done in 2009 have revealed that Guiyu has some of the highest levels of dioxin contamination globally.

Children under the age of 6 are especially vulnerable to lead poisoning, which can severely affect their mental and physical development or even be fatal. Lead can result in irreversible brain damage to their still-developing brains. Some symptoms of lead poisoning in children include loss of appetite, weight loss, fatigue, stomach pain, vomiting, constipation, and learning difficulties. Symptoms in adults include high blood pressure, decline in mental functioning, pain/numbness of extremities, muscle weakness, headache, stomach pain, memory loss, mood disorders, fertility problems, and a higher probability of miscarriages. For both children and adults, lead poisoning can result in damage to the kidneys and nervous system.

== Economic situation ==
The majority of the e-waste processed in Guiyu came from wealthier countries.

In 2015, authorities relegated e-waste processing in Guiyu to the outskirts. Some e-waste processing continues elsewhere in the city as part of the informal economy. Those engaged in informal e-waste recycling make decent money by local standards.

China banned the importation of foreign e-waste, and as of 2025 the e-waste processed in Guiyu is primarily domestic.

E-waste recycling helps to avoid valuable metals ending up in landfills and can decrease the mining of rare earth metals.

== Media coverage ==
Guiyu as an e-waste hub was first documented fully in December 2001 by the Basel Action Network, a non-profit organization which combats the practice of toxic waste export to developing countries in their report and documentary film entitled Exporting Harm. The health and environmental issues exposed by this report and subsequent scientific studies have greatly concerned international organizations such as the Basel Action Network and later Greenpeace and the United Nations Environment Programme and the Basel Convention. Media documentation of Guiyu is tightly regulated by the Chinese government, for fear of exposure or legal action. For example, a November 2008 news story by 60 Minutes, a popular US TV news program, documented the illegal shipments of electronic waste from recyclers in the US to Guiyu. While taping part of the story on-site at an illegal recycling dump in Guiyu, representatives of the Chinese recyclers attempted without success to confiscate the footage from the 60 Minutes TV crew. Greenpeace has protested the environmental impacts of e-waste recycling in Guiyu using different methods to raise awareness such as building a statue using e-waste collected from a site in Guiyu, or delivering a truckload of e-waste dumped in Guiyu back to Hewlett Packard headquarters. Greenpeace has been lobbying large consumer electronics companies to stop using toxic substances in their products, with varying degrees of effectiveness.

Critiquing the Western media discourse on Guiyu, academic Zoe Goldstein writes that "Guiyu's infamous 'e-waste dumping ground' label must be seen as a product of racist, orientalist Western media . . . as the racialisation of pollutants and further objectification of communities associated with them".

== Cleanup efforts ==
Since 2007, conditions in Guiyu have changed little despite the efforts of the central government to crack down on and enforce the long-standing e-waste import ban. However, the local government has created steps to improve environmental conditions because of the work of activist groups and increasing awareness of the situation. "It can be done. Look at what happened with lead acid batteries. We discovered they were hazardous, new legislation enforced new ways of dealing with the batteries which led to an infrastructure being created. The key was making it easy for people and companies to participate. It took years to build. E-waste is going the same route. But attitudes have changed and we will get there", says Robert Houghton, president and founder of Redemtech, an asset management and recovery firm. Zheng Songming, head of the Guiyu Township government has published a decree to ban burning electronics in fires and soaking them in sulfuric acid and promises supervision and fines for violations. Over 800 coal-burning furnaces have been destroyed because of this ordinance, and most notably, air quality has returned to Level II, now technically acceptable for habitation.

In 2013, 《汕头市贵屿地区电子废物污染综合整治方案》(Comprehensive Scheme of Resolving Electronic Waste Pollution of Guiyu region of Shantou City) was approved by Guangdong Province government. Part of this scheme involves building and relocating all the workshops into an industrial ecology park where the wastes can be properly treated and recycled. In 2017, most workshops were merged into larger companies and moved to the National Circular Economy Pilot Industry Park. However, many areas are still contaminated from the remnants of e-waste processing and have not been cleaned up.

From the perspective of environmental procedural justice, the transformation of Guiyu both reflects progress in inclusive environmental governance and exposes its limitations. Procedural justice emphasizes whether affected groups possess the rights to participate, be informed, and influence outcomes in environmental decision-making processes. The majority of electronic waste workers in Guiyu are rural migrant labourers. These workers are exposed to heavy metals and toxic chemicals over extended periods in small-scale or informal workshops. Lacking health insurance and labour contracts, their health issues receive no medical support from either the social security system or employers. They often bear the full cost of treating illnesses caused by workplace pollution. These workers are systematically excluded from environmental decision-making and benefit distribution, yet they shoulder the most significant risks. The establishment of the eco-industrial park reflects government intervention and responsibility in environmental health matters. However, this governance approach weakens the voices of the groups most directly affected. While government intervention has improved environmental conditions in Guiji, issues concerning worker health, social security, and procedural participation continue to be ongoing subjects of attention and research.

== In popular culture ==
- Chen Qiufan's novel The Waste Tide is heavily inspired by the recycling industry and environmental issues of Guiyu.

== See also ==
- Electronic waste in China
- Environmental issues in China
- Pollution in China
