= Recycling in Australia =

Method of waste management in Australia

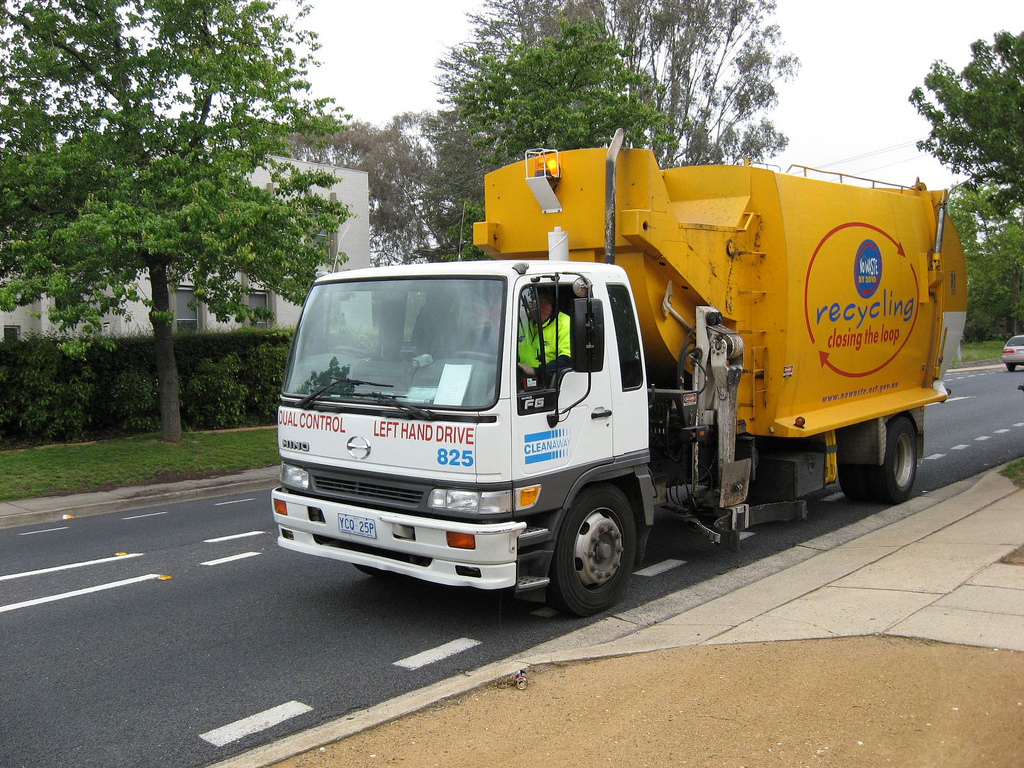
A recycling truck in Canberra, 2007

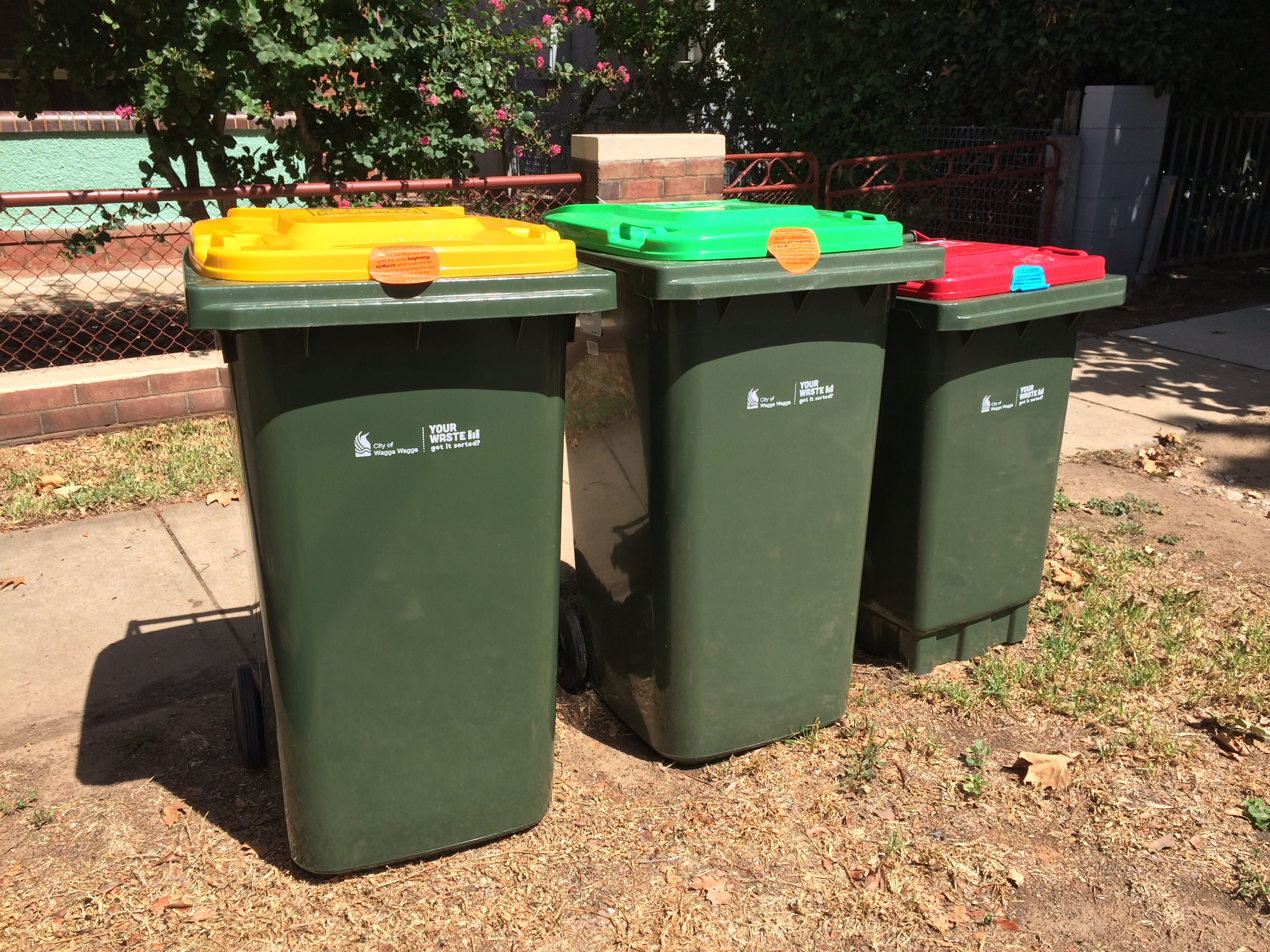
Yellow-lidded commingled recycling bin, green-lidded garden organics recycling bin, and red-lidded general waste bin for a household in Wagga Wagga

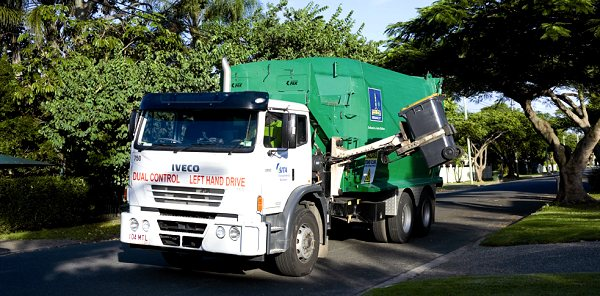
A recycling truck in Brisbane, 2012

In Australia, waste materials are categorised in three streams: municipal solid waste (MSW), construction and demolition (C&D) and commercial and industrial (C&I). Recycling in Australia is a widespread, and comprehensive part of waste management in Australia, with 60% of all waste collected being recycled. MMSW is collected from households, commercial businesses, industries and construction. Despite its prominence, household recycling makes up only a small part (13%) of Australia's total recycling. It generally occurs through kerbside recycling collections such as the commingled recycling bin and food/garden organics recycling bin, drop-off and take-back programs, and various other schemes. Collection and management of household waste typically falls to local councils, with private contractors collecting commercial, industrial and construction recycling. In addition to local council regulations, legislation and overarching policies are implemented and managed by the state and federal governments.

Australian recycling of soft plastics has notably suffered from the collapse of all capability to recycle at scale. There is as of yet no significant usage of recycled soft plastics in Australia.

== History ==
=== Early recycling efforts (1920–1950) ===
Prior to World War II, open and unregulated landfills as well as incinerators were a popular and viable solution to Australia's waste problem. The only material with enough value to compensate recycling was waste paper. Waste paper collections from households and factories started in Melbourne in the 1920s, with the practice becoming widespread across Australia by the 1940s due to the start of World War II. In addition to the collection and recycling of paper, World War II caused a very high level of demand for resources such as metal, paper, and rubber waste to contribute to the war effort. Despite the rise in recycling, these recycling practises faded after the war with no sustainable market for these resources.

=== Second wave of recycling (1970–2017) ===
The 1970s saw the return of recycling due to an explosion of public concern about the protection of the environment. Similarly to pre World War II, the only major recycled product was paper- with 30% of consumption collected. During the 1970s also saw the introduction of community recycling centres in Melbourne and Sydney local councils where the community could voluntarily bring glass, metal and paper.

In the late 1980s and early 1990s many local councils began kerbside recycling collections. Kerbside recycling collections allowed Australian households to separate out recyclables such as paper and glass for processing. During this time extensive education campaigns educated Australians about the new practice, which has become commonplace well into the 21st century.

One campaign, ‘Do the Right Thing’ was a highly successful advertising campaign launched by Keep Australia Beautiful which ran during the 1980s to help educate the public about litter and the importance of recycling.

The introduction of container deposit schemes in Australia during the 1980s and 1990s encouraged community groups to collect aluminium cans for recycling in many states and territories. Newspaper publishers also agreed to pay for paper waste to be collected by councils thus helping to fund kerbside collections. Collection rates for both materials rose to about 65% Australia wide with the amount of waste generated by each person reaching ~1 tonne a year.

At the United Nations Conference on Environment and Development in Rio de Janeiro in 1992 Australia was a signatory to Agenda 21. Agenda 21 was designed for countries to "commit to waste minimisation, environmentally sound waste reuse and recycling, and environmentally sound waste treatment and disposal."

In an attempt to encourage recycling, Australian states started imposing higher levies on landfills after 2006. This caused a reduction in landfill waste as the high costs (up to $200 tonne by 2014 in New South Wales) caused a strain on the disposal of waste.

=== Post Operation National Sword (2018–present) ===
On 1 January 2018, China announced Operation National Sword, an operation that restricted imports on 24 categories of Australian recycling materials, resulting in stockpiling of recyclable materials in Australia with no destination. The President of the Waste Management and Resource Recovery Association of Australia (WMRR), Garth Lamb, had advocated for infrastructure projects to use recovered recycled materials rather than raw materials, such as crushed glass replacing sand in roadworks. The new restrictions placed by China impose a maximum contamination threshold for accepted materials of 0.5%- a rate hard to achieve by the industry in Australia due to the levels of contamination. Prior to Operation National Sword, Australia sent 1.25 million tons of waste to China in 2017.

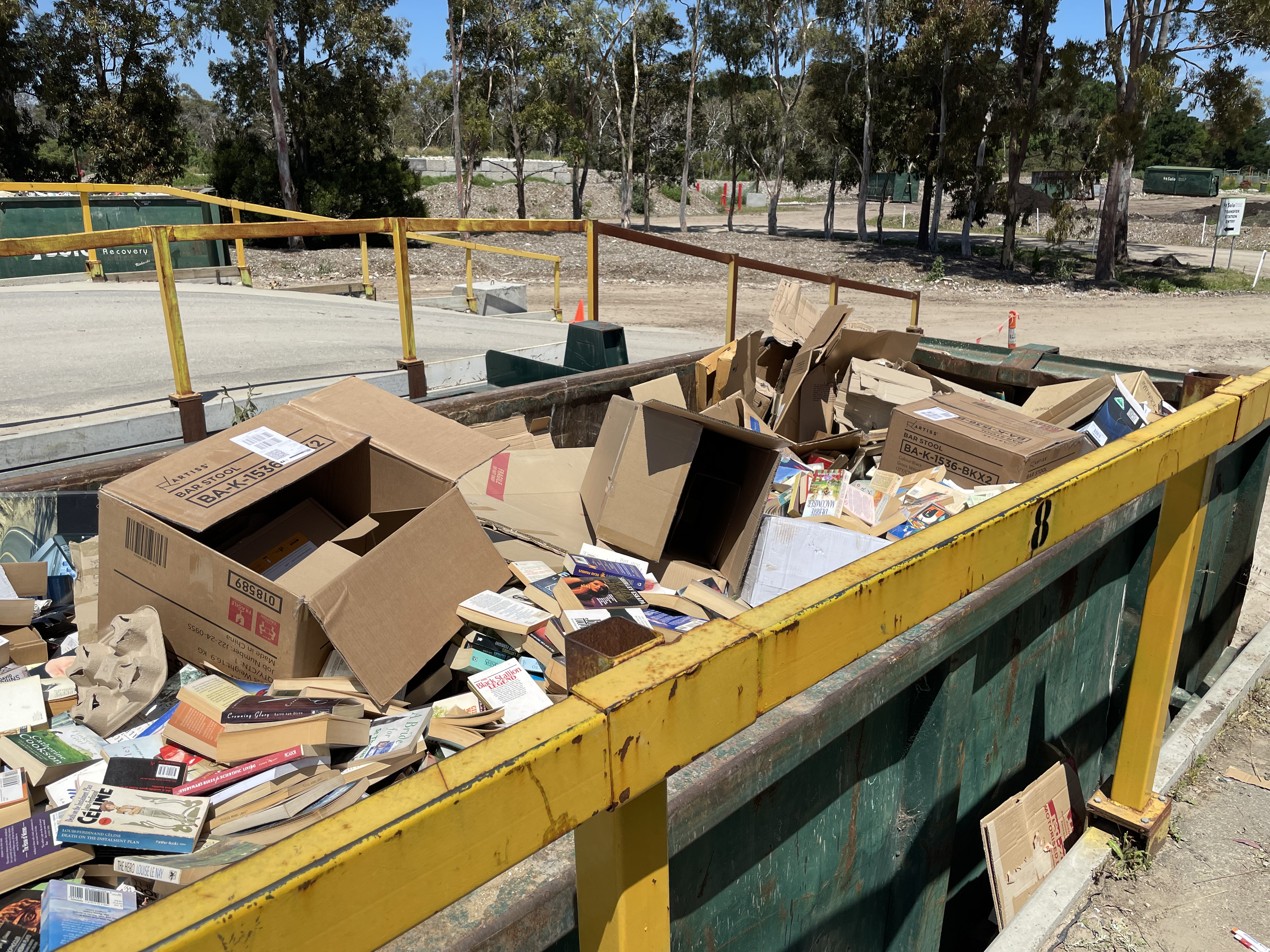
Paper recycling at a resource recovery centre in Tyabb, Victoria in 2022

In an effort to rejuvenate the Australian recycling industry, a range of policies and programs have been established to reduce contamination and recycle more of Australia's waste onshore. In addition to programs established by South Australia in 1977 and the Northern Territory in 2012, container deposit schemes have been widely rolled out or are planning to be introduced in the remaining 6 Australian states and territories by 2023. These programs have reduced contamination as bottles and cans are separated from the waste stream before being contaminated.

A parliamentary inquiry into the waste and recycling industry in Australia filed a report on 13 June 2018.

In 2020, the Victorian Government announced a recycling industry overhaul focusing on increasing recycling and reducing the amount of waste sent to landfills. This overhaul included the introduction of a container deposit scheme to be introduced in November 2023, the introduction of a new household glass bin by 2027, the standardisation of bin lids, and mandating that every household will have a food and garden organics (FOGO) bin by 2030.

== Incentives ==
=== Costs ===
To incentivise recycling, local councils provide heavy discounts or the inclusion of a household recycling bin for free. In contrast, food and garden organic bins require a payment however are discounted. These incentives make recycling a viable option for households due to the small or non-existent cost associated with using the service/s.

=== Education ===
Advertising campaigns based on educating the public about how to recycle, cohesive product labelling (the Australasian Recycling Label), and events including Planet Ark's 'National Recycling Week' assists in raising awareness on the issues surrounding recycling and how to correctly recycle.

== Household recycling ==
Household recycling in Australia is typically done through a system of kerbside collection bins with different coloured lids to represent different waste streams. The majority of states and territories use a red lid for landfill, yellow lid for recycling, and a green lid for food and garden organics. In some New South Wales councils, a blue lid is used for paper and cardboard recycling, and Victoria is currently rolling out a purple lid bin for glass recycling. In 2018/19, 63% of all waste produced in Australia was recycled or recovered. In 2016–2017, 46% of Municipal Solid Waste (MSW) was recycled.

=== Recycling (yellow lid) ===
Recycling in Australia is managed on a council basis, where each council has their own rules on what can and can't be placed in the recycling bin. Despite this, the following items are commonly placed in the recycling bin:

- Aluminium cans, foil, and trays
- Glass bottles and jars
- Paper, cartons, and cardboard
- Plastic bottles, trays, and containers
- Steel cans and aerosols

==== Metals ====
Metals collected through kerbside recycling bins include aluminium and steel which can be converted into new products depending on their level of contamination, the quality of the recycling, and the characteristics of the metal.

Aluminium can be repurposed into new consumer metal products (cans, foil, trays) and can also be used in aeroplanes and consumer electronics. Due to the aluminium's unique properties and high sale price, it can be recycled endlessly into new products. Recycling rates in Australia for aluminium packaging sits between 44% and 66% with the majority of processing occurring onshore.

Steel cans are most commonly used in food packaging, as paint containers, and as aerosol cans which can all be recycled through kerbside collection. Recycled cans can be reprocessed into new food packaging, railway tracks, car parts and construction materials. In 2018, the rate of steel recycling was ~56% in Australia.

==== Glass ====
Glass recycling is common in Australia with a recycling rate of 46%. Recycling of glass occurs mostly onshore through companies like Visy and O–I Asia. The process of recycling glass involves sortation and melting of the products to produce new glass products, sand, or for use in the construction of road projects.

The Victorian Government announced in 2020 that every Victorian household would receive a purple lidded glass recycling bin. The rollout will be completed by 2027 with the aim of reducing contamination in the yellow lid recycling bin and to increase the state's recycling rate.

==== Paper, cartons and cardboard ====
The quality of paper and cardboard degrades over time as the recycling process continues. This means that traditionally the end product after the recycling process is at a lower quality than the original virgin product. In 2022, the majority of Australia's paper and cardboard is mostly recycled in Australia. Prior to the 2018 Operation National Sword, 55% of Australia's paper and cardboard waste was recycled locally with 28% recycled in China.

Australia also has numerous carton (Tetra Pak) recycling facilities.

==== Plastic ====
Plastics accepted in most kerbside recycling bins include: type 1 (PET), type 2 (HDPE), and type 5 (PP).

Plastic name	SPI resin ID code	Example items
Polyethylene terephthalate	1	Water/juice/soda bottles, jars, and bottle caps
High-density polyethylene	2	Shampoo and detergent bottles
Polypropylene	5	Yogurt containers, take away containers, disposable cups and plates, and plant pots

Other plastics (type 3, type 4, type 6, and type 7) aren't always recyclable through kerbside collection. Type 6 (polystyrene) can be dropped off at council operated transfer stations for recycling. Type 4 (low-density polyethylene) was able to be recycled through REDcycle drop off points in supermarkets in a program that ended in 2022.

Plastic waste can be reprocessed in a number of ways, with the result of being reconverted into various new products, such as bottles, bins, bags or piping. Prior to the introduction of Operation National Sword in 2018, 71% of Australian exports of scrap paper/paperboard and scrap plastics went to China. After the introduction of Operation National Sword, the figure fell significantly to only 16% of exported mixed plastic scrap being sent to China during the full financial year of 2017–18. This fell even further to 8% of exported mixed plastic scrap going to China in June 2018.

Despite challenges faced in the industry, such as the collapse of the REDcycle program, the plastics recycling industry is beginning to recover in Australia due to government incentives, export restrictions and supermarket cooperative work.

=== Food and garden organics (green lid) ===
Similar to recycling, food and garden organic collections are managed on a council basis with weekly or fortnightly collections. Traditionally, these bins would only include green garden waste collections, however since as early as 2013 in the City of Bunbury in Western Australia, food waste began being accepted in the bins alongside the renaming of the bins to "food organics and garden organics" (FOGO). These changes have contributed to an uptake in food and garden organic recycling. Accepted items vary council to council, however these items are commonly accepted in the food and garden organics bin:

- Lawn clippings, weeds, and leaves
- Sticks and small branches
- Fruits and vegetables
- Meats and fish
- Bread, pasta, and egg shells
- Dairy products
- Compostable bin liners
- Compostable packaging

Upon collection, contents of the bin are taken to a composting site where it is screened for contamination before being turned into soil, potting mix, or mulch.

=== Hard waste collection ===
Hard waste collections occur in most suburban and regional councils and is designed to collect waste that is too large for a kerbside collection bin or for items that aren't accepted in any of the standard waste collections. Fixed hard waste collections happen twice a year, typically during the seasons of autumn and spring. Some councils use a ticketed approach where the resident has two collections per year that they can redeem at any time. Items collected during a hard waste collection may be disposed, recycled, or reused depending on the condition. Items typically accepted include:

Waste stream	Example items	Disposal method	Notes
Green waste	Sticks, tree branches, logs	Recycled	Councils typically ask for bundled green waste
Scrap metal	Metal drums, car parts, white goods, hot water units	Recycled	Sometimes reused if in good condition
Hard waste	Clothes, pottery, broken mirrors and glass, carpet, furniture	Typically disposed	Sometimes reused if in good condition
Electronics	Any item with a plug or a cord (TVs, computers, printers)	Recycled	Sometimes reused if in good condition
Mattresses	Mattresses	Typically recycled	

As hard waste is placed on a residents nature strip, members of the public are able to access and take items for their own reuse and repurpose. This removes the need for recycling or disposal and gives the item a longer use life.

=== Drop-off locations ===
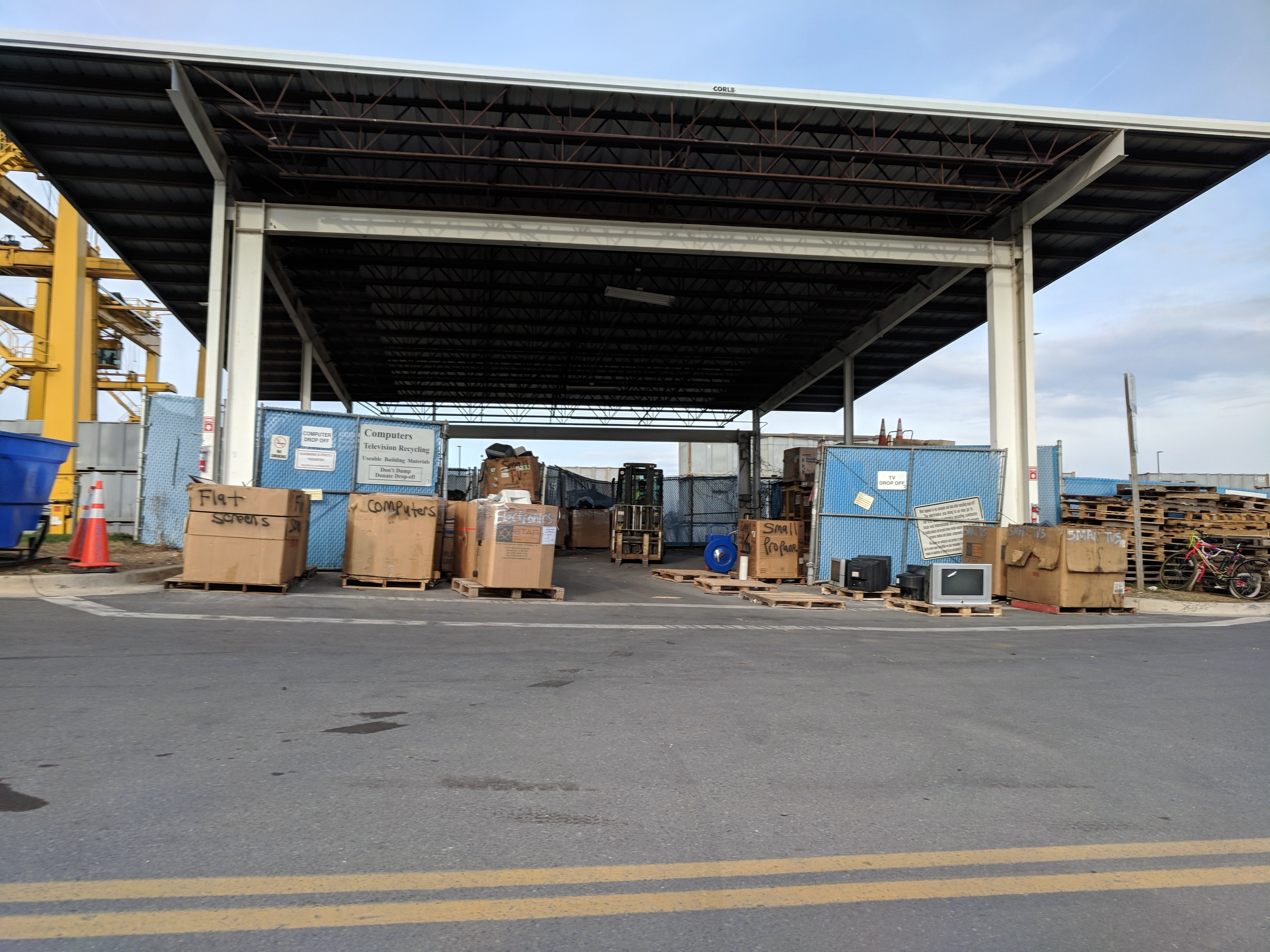
A transfer station

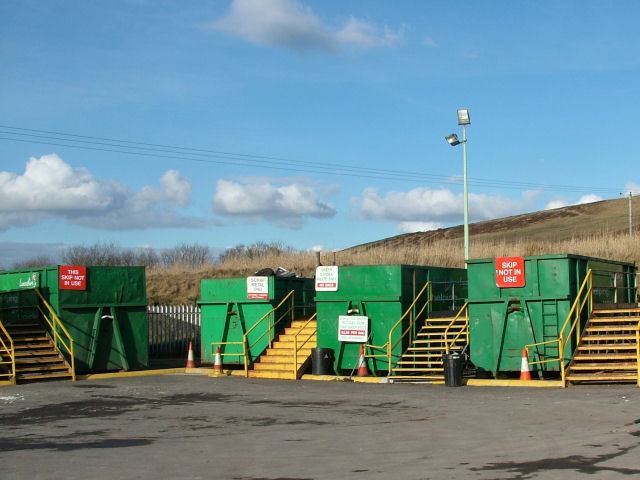
Skips in a recycling centre

For waste that cannot be recycled through traditional kerbside collections (hard to recycle items) or in areas where kerbside collections aren't available, drop-off locations provide options for waste disposal and recycling. Drop-off locations include council transfer stations and store drop-offs programs.

==== Transfer stations ====
Transfer Stations are common across Australia to dispose of waste and hard to recycle items. The centres are designed to encourage sortation of items to reduce contamination, increase the cleanliness of the waste, and reduce the amount of waste sent to landfill. Items commonly accepted at transfer stations are similar to what is accepted in a hard waste collection. Items commonly accepted include:

- Electronic waste
- Scrap metal
- Hard waste
- Recyclables
- Mattesses
- Green waste
- Polystyrene
- Batteries
- Light globes
- Printer ink cartridges
- Paint and chemicals
- CDs, DVDs, cassettes
- Waste oil

==== Store drop-off ====
Store drop-offs are designed to be easily accessible to the consumer to dispose of their hard to recycle items, and similarly to transfer stations, require the recycler to sort items for recycling. Supermarkets and retailers that sell hard to recycle items typically have a bin for customers to dispose of these hard to recycle waste streams, with examples of bins including soft plastics, batteries, ink cartridges, and electronic waste.

==== Unconventional waste ====
===== Electronic waste =====
Electronic waste collection services were mandated under The National Television and Computer Recycling Scheme in 2011, and can be dropped off at transfer stations, and electronic/appliance retailers. Individual components are first separated from the electronic waste before each individual element is sent to be recycled. Major e-waste recyclers in Australia include Mobile Muster and Tech Collect, with most technology stores providing mobile phone or e-waste recycling bins.

A study conducted in 2019 estimates that Australia recycles only 12–20% of its e-waste.

In Victoria and South Australia, it is illegal to dispose of e-waste in landfills. More states, including Western Australia, are planning to implement a ban by the end of the 2020s.

===== Soft plastics =====
Type 4 plastics (low density-polyethylene or soft plastics) are hard to recycle due to its tendency to become caught in processing machines at material recovery facilities. Despite its difficulty to recycle, the material is also extremely common with 70 billion pieces used each year in Australia.

Soft plastic recycling was previously handled through the REDcycle program, until its collapse in 2022. It was uncovered that the programme had been stockpiling rather than recycling soft plastics prior to its collapse. REDcycle claimed that it had become dependent on a single recycling operator, and that it was difficult to find financially viable methods of converting soft plastics into useful materials, stating that there were no longer recycling options available for soft plastics in Australia. It was later reported that even at the programme's peak, less than 2% of soft plastics were collected by REDcycle for recycling.

Following the collapse, Aldi, Coles and Woolworths have started cooperating on finding solutions to the soft plastic recycling through the Soft Plastic Taskforce, chaired by the Department of Climate Change, Energy, the Environment and Water. A year after the collapse, only 1% of the stockpiled 11,000 tonnes of REDcycle soft plastics had been recycled, with large scale collection programmes remaining paused. For a period of time, outside of a small number of locations, soft plastics recycling was not possible in Australia.

At present, national recycling targets for plastic packaging (including some soft plastics) stand at 70%, with an actual rate of product recycling standing at 6%.

===== Polystyrene =====
Polystyrene (or type 6 plastic) is a common and very lightweight plastic, used for packaging and protection of goods. Polystyrene can be dropped off at most transfer stations for recycling, where it can be turned into coat hangers and synthetic timber. The Australia Packaging Covenant reports that only 29.7% of expanded polystyrene used for packaging is recycled. Preventing this rate from being higher is the high likelihood of contaminating other recyclables and the difficulty of sorting.

===== Batteries =====
Although programs have existed before, in 2013, Aldi Supermarkets introduced the first supermarket battery recycling program in Australia. The program allowed customers to return AA, AAA, C, D, and 9V. Since the program was launched, through its partners Aldi have recycled 351 tonnes of batteries. In 2020 alone, 7.5 million batteries were diverted from landfill. Since Aldi's launch, numerous other supermarkets and stores have launched similar battery recycling programs, with battery recycling rates growing to 10% by 2021.

In April 2018, the first onshore lithium battery recycling plant was opened in New Gisborne, Victoria.

In February 2022, "B-cycle" was federally authorised under the Product Stewardship Act. B-cycle is a national recycling scheme in place to make it easier for Australians to dispose of their old batteries. B-cycle works with major retailers including Woolworths, Coles, Bunnings, Officeworks and Aldi to put battery collection bins at their stores to maximise coverage and access to the bins.

Lead batteries (or car batteries) can be recycled at council operated transfer stations. There is a 99% recycling rate for lead batteries in 2021.

===== Light bulbs =====
Transfer stations and all IKEA stores accept light bulbs and fluorescent tubes for recycling.

===== Automotive =====
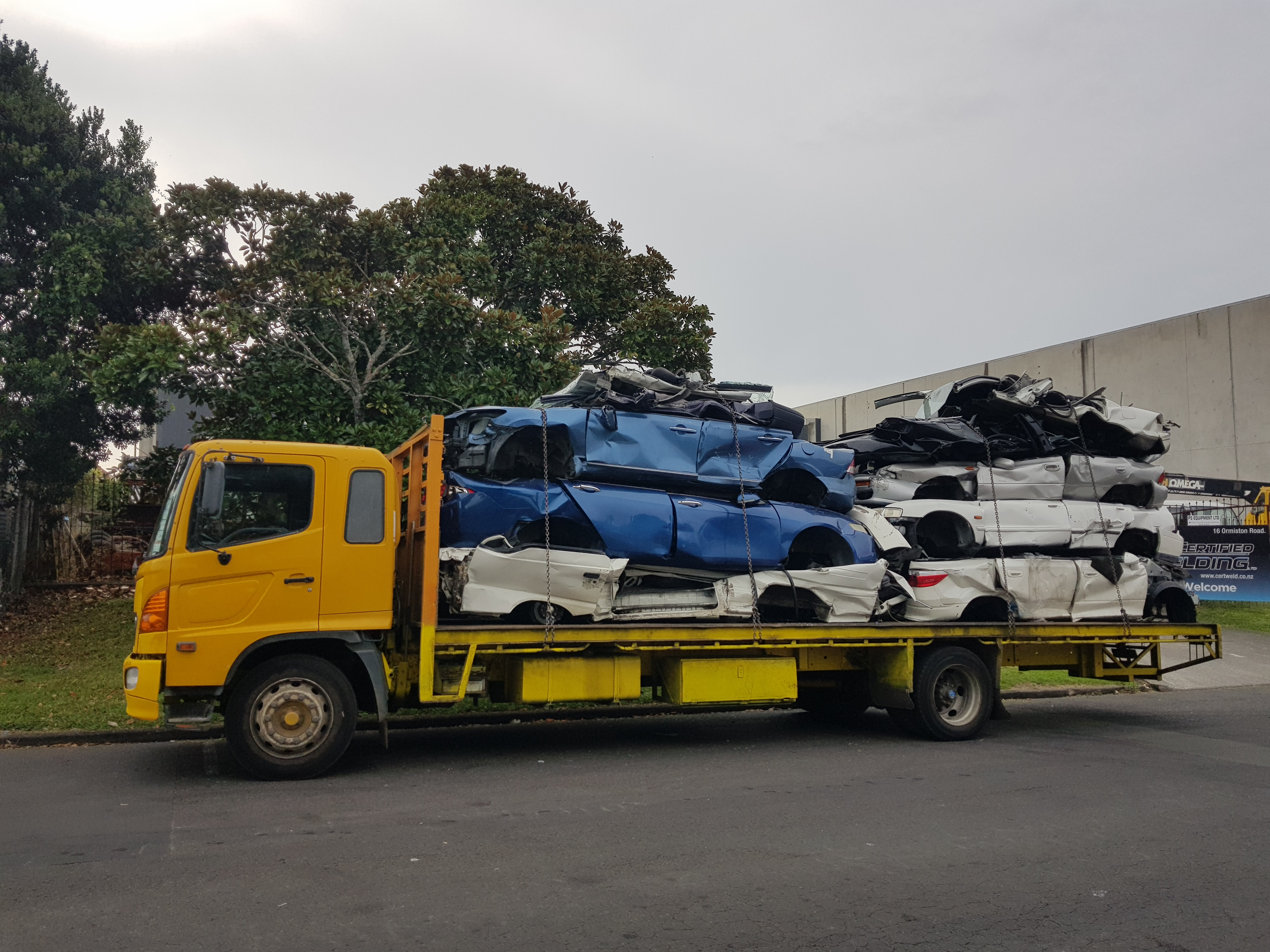
Truck with scrap car bodies, 2022

Automotive recycling is considered one of the main solutions the growing number of vehicles reaching end-of-life (EOL) cycle. According to the Australian Bureau of Statistics, during 2001 to 2015 the number of new motor vehicles sales increased by 48% in Australia. The average life cycle of vehicle in Australia of 10.1 years, with the number of vehicles reaching its EOL cycle growing fast too. During 2014 to 2015, 765,828 vehicles reached their end-of-life cycle.

In Australia, vehicles that have reached their EOL are passed from owners to the auto recyclers directly or through an insurance company, car mechanics, or used car dealers. In first stage of recycling, the car batteries and fluids are removed during the de-pollution process. In the second stage, the valuable and high demand vehicle parts are recovered from the vehicles and sold in the market for reuse. In last stage of the recycling process, the remaining parts of the vehicle are crushed and sent to metal recycling facilities to recover metals from the vehicle.

===== Printer ink cartridges =====
Printer ink cartridges are recycled through a program by the non-profit Cartridges 4 Planet Ark. The program was founded in 2003 by Planet Ark with support from seven printer ink manufacturers, the program recycler Close the Loop and retailers. The program has diverted 51 million cartridges from landfill with over 4,000 drop off locations nationwide. Upon collection, cartridges are sorted and recycled into recycled inks, road surfaces, and eWood garden beds.

===== Paint and chemicals =====
The majority of paint waste in Australia is recycled by the not-for-profit company Paintback. Since beginning operations in 2016, Paintback has recycled over 36 million kilograms of paint and packaging through 165+ drop-off locations. The program is funded by a 15-cent per litre levy on products sold by Australia's major paint manufacturers.

Chemical and hazardous waste recycling is promenade in Australia with most states having collection programs. Once collected, chemicals are sealed in drums and are transported to a specialist waste treatment facility for recycling.

State	Program/s
New South Wales	Community recycling centres and household Chemical CleanOut events by the NSW EPA
Queensland	There is no state based program in Queensland, however local councils do provide services
South Australia	Free household chemicals and paint drop-off by Green Industries
Tasmania	Household hazardous waste collection days by the Northern Tasmanian Waste Management Group
Victoria	Detox Your Home by Sustainability Victoria
Western Australia	Household Hazardous Waste Program by WALGA

===== Coffee pods =====
Coffee pods can be recycled through produces of the pods including companies like Nespresso which have organised collection points at their stores, and created campaigns to help reduce their disposal issues. Coffee residuals are used as compost and aluminium can be recycled into cans, aeroplanes, and consumer products.

===== Textiles =====
Clothes that are in good condition are encouraged to be donated at charity shops, donation bins or kerbside bagged collection. This extends the life of the clothing and reduces the need for recycling. In cases where textiles aren't able to be donated, recycling is preferred. In Australia, there are a range of textile recycling businesses, store drop-off programs, and reuse initiatives.

In total, more than 800,000 tonnes of leather, rubber and textiles were discarded 2018–19 with a recycling rate of just 7 per cent according to the most recent National Waste Report. Despite this low figure, donations are common with a rate of (on average) 12.1 kg of clothing textiles donated per person in Australia.

== Commercial and industrial recycling ==
In Australia, commercial and industrial (also large apartments buildings) recycling is collected by private waste management contractors, as business council rates don't cover waste and recycling. Excluding hazardous waste, it isn't compulsory to sort waste into different streams, however, it is more cost effective to recycle due to high fees associated with garbage collection. In the state of New South Wales, general waste often costs more than twice as much as cardboard recycling.

Almost 33 million tones of C&I waste is generated each year in Australia, with 53% (over 17 million tonnes) recycled. Detailed breakdowns of C&I recycling are not recently available, but they cover similar types of materials as household recycling, as shown below.

Summary the C&l waste/recycling streams by material (for industries studied)
Material type	Landfilled ('000 tonnes)	Recycled/recovered ('000 tonnes)	Total waste generation ('000 tonnes)	Recycling rate (%)
Cardboard	803	1 834	2 637	70%
Steel	159	802	961	83%
Office paper	394	704	1 095	64%
Unknown	1 536	596	2 133	28%
Food organics	1 499	416	1 915	22%
Other paper	264	282	546	52%
Timber	498	278	775	36%
Masonry materials	239	224	463	48%
Other organics	439	216	656	33%
Other glass	31	112	142	79%
Aluminium	21	90	111	81%
Other plastics	368	76	444	17%
Packaging glass	22	54	76	71%
Plastic packaging	346	41	387	11%
Leather & textiles	107	27	134	20%
Tyres/rubber	40	13	53	25%
Other metals	<1	<1	<1	88%
Garden organics	56	-	56	0%
Total	6 820	5 764	12 584	46%*

*Overall recycling rate – not a total of the column.

== Construction and demolition recycling ==
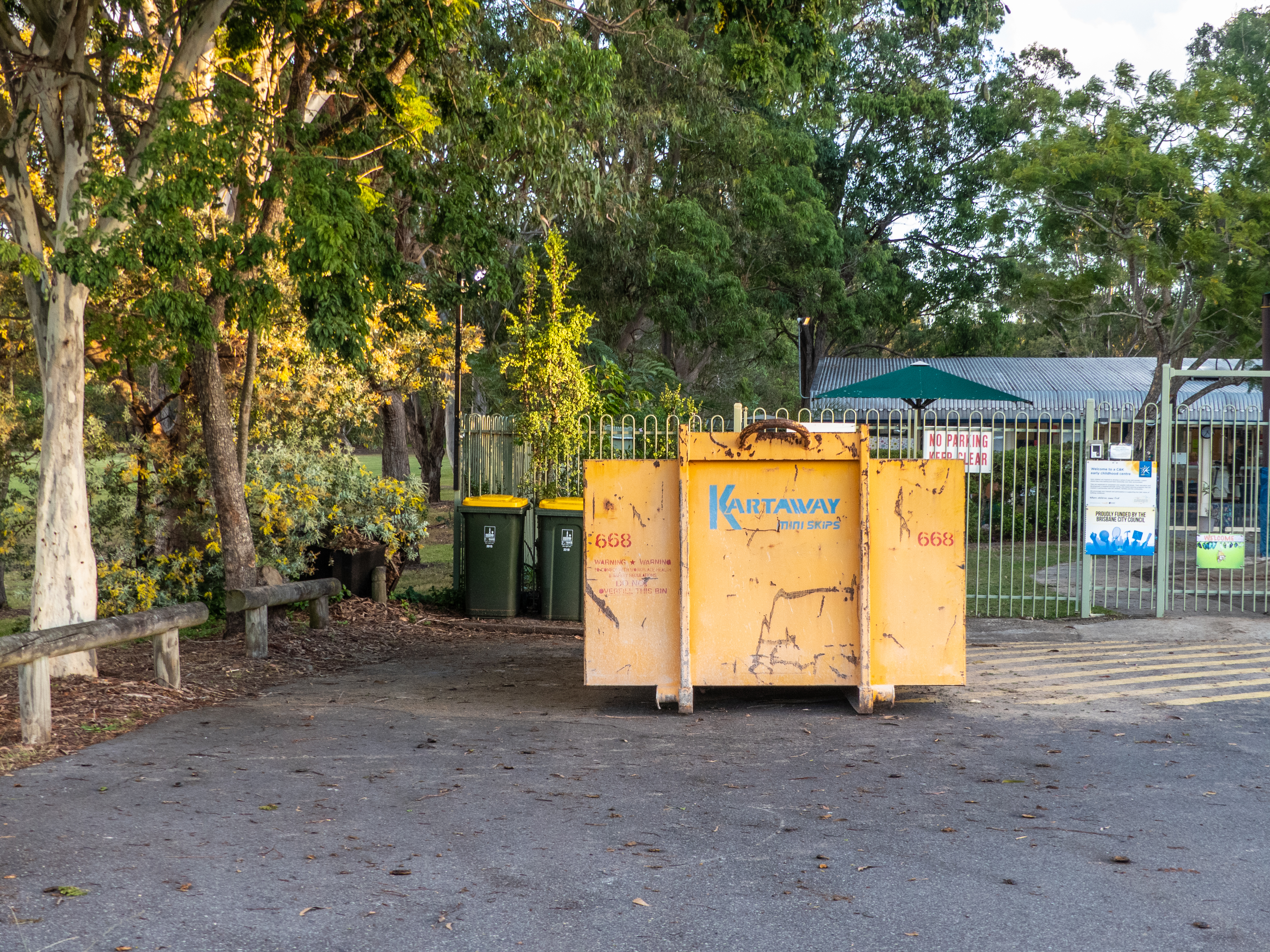
A construction waste skip bin, 2019

Construction sites usually don't sort their waste for recycling onsite, and instead dispose of it in a landfill or sort it offsite for recycling. For demolition sites, waste is sometimes sorted and sold for reuse – examples being roof tiles, bricks, and building fixtures.

In total, the Construction and Demolition (C&D) sector recycled almost 80% of the 29 million tonnes it generated, the highest recycling rate of the three sectors.

In cases where waste is sorted offsite, materials are recovered for resale and recycling at a materials recovery facility. Metals are recovered by a magnet, concrete, rock, stones and sand separated by trommels, timber is extracted, shredded and resold, bricks are separated and resold, and soil is cleaned and sold. The recycling process produces numerous different products that can be continued to be reused.

== See also ==
- Circular economy
- Container deposit legislation in Australia
- Doughnut (economic model)
- Environmental issues in Australia
- Environmental movement in Australia
- Green waste
- Litter in Australia
- Recycling
- Waste management in Australia
