= China's waste import ban =

Chinese government policy initiative

China's waste import ban, instated at the end of 2017, prevented foreign inflows of waste products. Starting in early 2018, the government of China, under Operation National Sword, banned the import of several types of waste, including plastics with a contamination level of above 0.05 percent. The ban has greatly affected recycling industries worldwide, as China had been the world's largest importer of waste plastics and processed hard-to-recycle plastics for other countries, especially in the West.

The decision caused widespread repercussions on a global scale. In July 2018, China produced a document to the World Trade Organization regarding environmental and health issues. China requested an urgent change to be made revolving the imported waste China imports from other countries. The recommended list was pushing forward for wastes such as plastics, textile, and paper products to be banned from imports.

Since 2026, China has gradually removed the import ban of foreign waste due to increasing demand and recycling capacity.

== Background ==
China is the largest importer of waste plastics, accounting for 56% of the global market. Meanwhile, the United States, Japan, Germany, and the United Kingdom are the main source countries. Since 2010, China has begun to implement more stringent waste import policies that correspond with the quality of import waste and improvement of domestic production capacity. Likewise, environmental and health considerations have led China to introduce the waste import policy in 2017 which bans the import of 24 types of solid waste, including certain types of plastics, paper, and textiles. Based on a study by the University of Georgia, it is predicted that by 2030 with this policy, 111 million metric tons of plastic waste will be left unaccounted for.

=== Chinese plastic history ===
In the 1990s, economic development and the rise in living standards increased China's demand for plastic products by 21% annually. However, in that year, China lacked raw materials, and production levels were incapable of meeting its growing needs. Moreover, they did not have an efficient recycling system, and waste was collected through an informal recycling network.

From 1980 to 1994, the recycling rate of waste products in China fell by 11%, which brought about pressure on the state. In some big cities, a large number of waste plastics were not being recycled and led to blockages in the urban drainage system. About 60% of plastic waste in China was discarded or not recycled at that time. In 1994, China's agricultural film consumption was 1.9 million tons, but 300,000 tons of agricultural film remained in farmland every year, affecting the soil and causing animal diseases.

In the early 21st century, China had become the second largest plastic producer in the world, second to the US. However, China's domestic productivity still could not meet their demand for plastics. Furthermore, the rising crude oil prices at the time also led to the inflation of the price of pure plastics. At the same time, although the price of waste plastics had also increased, waste plastics were still relatively cheap when compared to virgin plastics. Thus, in order to cope with demand and lower costs, the import of waste was increased again. This led China to rely heavily on the import of waste. Furthermore, this made other countries in the world dependent on China's imports of waste plastics.

==== The Green Fence Operation ====
The quality of recyclable materials exported to China gradually declined; a large amount of the waste entering China was mixed with food, garbage, and other pollutants. These unmanageable waste products have thus burdened the Chinese government. Similarly, the profitability of the waste industry attracted speculators to invest in the market. In order to enhance the management of the market and the reduction of illegal traffic, the Chinese government decided to implement the green fence operation. This initiative was designed to monitor the quality and flow of incoming waste and combat smuggling. It was reported that in just five months, China customs had seized 337 cases of smuggled solid waste, amounting to 1.7 billion RMB in value.

According to the regulations of the China Waste Plastics Association, import license transactions are prohibited, and imported waste plastics must be delivered to factories with import qualifications in accordance with the provisions of the import license. Since countries are dependent on China's waste imports, this action had adversely affected the entire value chain of waste plastics and exporting countries.

In Chinese ports, inspections of waste have slowed down port operations, which means that exporters need to bear the demurrage of the goods left in the dock before the inspection. At the same time, a large number of waste materials that have not passed the review have also been returned. By the end of 2013, China's waste imports had been reduced by one million metric tons. China's policy has made exporting countries aware of the drawbacks of excessive dependence on exports. Hence, this will bring a negative impact on the domestic reprocessing capacity of exporting countries.

=== Plastic recycling ===
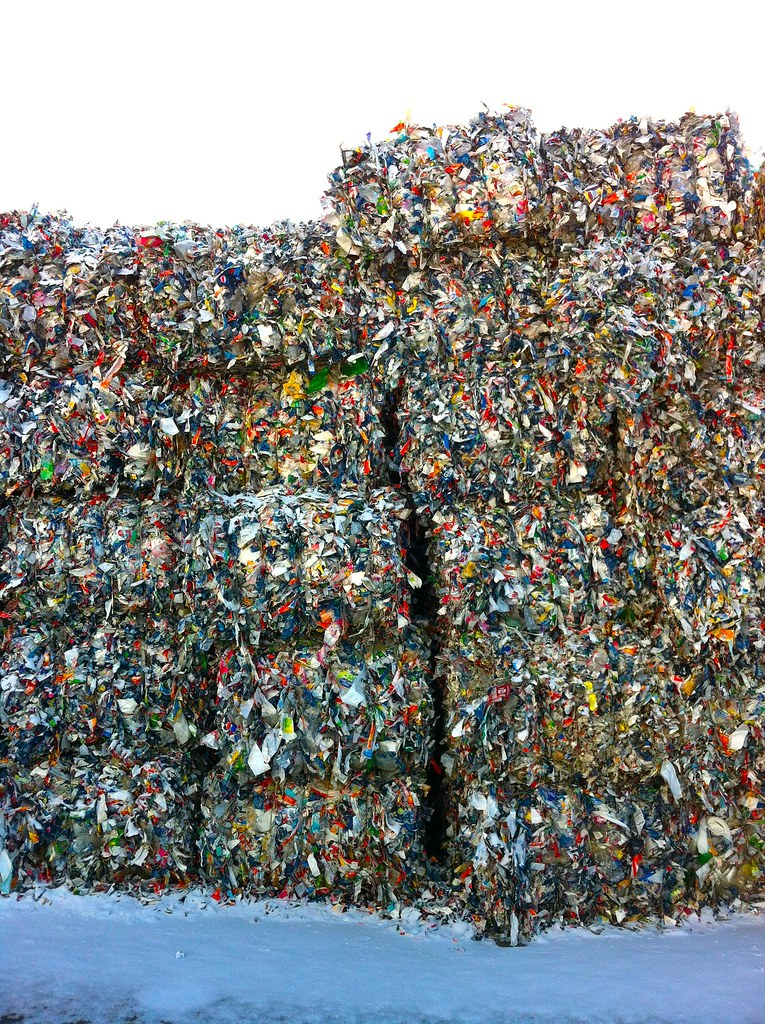
Packed and prepared plastic

It was reported that roughly 50% of plastics are being utilized in disposable manufacturing processes such as packaging, agricultural films, and disposables, while 20 to 25% was used for long-term infrastructure like pipes, coating for cables and structured materials and the remainder is used for durable moderate life consumer goods such as electronics, furniture, and vehicles. In general, plastic is considered to be durable and non-biodegradable hence making them difficult to decompose for at least a few decades with some lasting over hundreds or thousands of years. Judging from the domestic environmental factors, even some degradable plastics may still exist for a considerable period of time due to their degradation rate which is also influenced by factors such as the exposure of UV, oxygen, and temperature, whereas biodegradable plastics require the need of adequate microorganisms. Therefore, the rate of degradation in landfills and terrestrial, marine environments would tend to vary.

Due to poor management of plastic waste, most plastics are currently disposed of in unauthorized dumping sites or burned uncontrollably in the field. Moreover, due to the particularity and quantity of plastics, the recycling of plastics has always been a problem. In theory, most thermoplastics could be recycled in a closed loop. However, plastic packaging may call for the need to use different kinds of polymers as well as other materials such as metals, paper, pigments, inks, and adhesives, which make it challenging to control. Setting up a landfill is one of the traditional methods of waste managements, but some countries lack the land to accommodate to landfills. The process of incineration will reduce the need for a dedicated plastic waste landfill, but this brings up the issue of whether or not harmful substances being released into the atmosphere during this process.

Furthermore, collecting and packaging plastics for sale to other countries is much cheaper than recycling.

==== Sorting ====
The first step of waste disposal is to divide it into different categories. Recycling standards vary across different countries. But we can divide them into two big categories, recyclable and non-recyclable waste. In general, plastic products can be fully recycled. The difficulty is the sorting process. For example, although the plastic bottle is theoretically 100% recyclable, the plastic bottle cap and the label cannot be mixed together for recycling because they are different plastic materials. The sorting machine is currently unable to unscrew the cap and tear off the label, so this step must be done manually by the sorting worker. This process obviously increases the business cost and human resources. Some illegal industries recycle mixed plastic products together to control the costs; this causes incomplete recycling of plastic, which leads to some unexpected environmental issues.

==== Burning ====
The general disposal method is to categorize the types of waste and dispose of them in different processes. However, a few illegal industries want to minimize the cost of disposing of the waste, so they choose the easiest way to deal with the rubbish. Through the inappropriate use of landfills and incinerators, they earn money from the disposal of waste, rather than gaining the secondary benefits of properly recycling the waste. The burning of uncategorized waste produces toxic and contaminated air, which is harmful to human health. Carbon dioxide is also produced by the process of burning waste. According to statistics, the global total carbon dioxide produced in 2018 was about 37.1 gigatonnes. Some power plants are operated by the heat produced from the burning of waste (Waste-to-energy plant). It is a combination of disposing of waste and producing electricity, which is widely adopted in China's waste disposal industries.

==== Pyrolysis plants ====
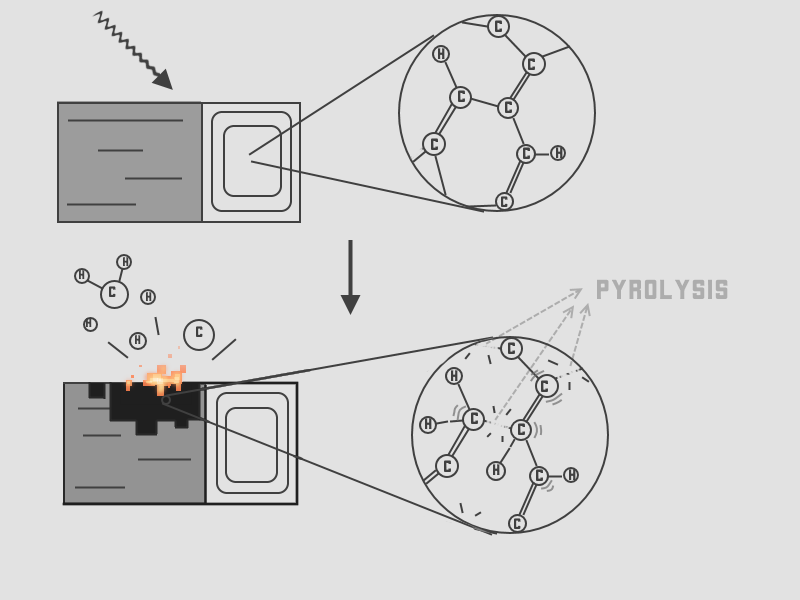
Pyrolysis

Pyrolysis plants are a technology that can aid waste disposal. The process is described as such: "Plastics are crushed and melted at temperatures below gasification temperature and in a low-oxygen environment. Heat decomposes plastic polymers into smaller hydrocarbons that can be refined into diesel or even other petrochemical products, including new plastics." This technology is still in the demonstration phase and is expected to expand globally. The facilities are built in China as well. Pyrolysis plants can recycle many hard-to-decompose materials that normal recyclers cannot. They will produce little carbon dioxide and no pollution at all. The economic profits from expensive pyrolysis plants are the determining factor in whether more of these plants will be built.

== Ban policy ==
China determined in July 2017 and announced on 16 August 2017 that it would stop the import of 24 kinds of solid waste from foreign countries. Solid wastes including plastics, paper products, and textiles, etc. The new policy was implemented on 1 January 2018, and banned the imports of those wastes.

An even tighter policy was announced on 15 November 2017, to take effect on 1 March 2018. This policy severely reduced the allowable contamination levels on a number of scrap material imports. The newly proposed maximum thresholds for contamination were so low that they amounted in practice to another ban.

A further policy aimed to ban almost all waste imports into the country. The Ministry of Ecology and Environment of China announced the new policy on 19 April 2018. 16 types of "Category 7" materials will be banned from import beginning 31 December 2018. Another 16 materials will be banned on 31 December 2019.

It's important to notice the amount of imported foreign wastes that were unauthorized by the government, which flowed in country through reselling licenses, fake report, and smuggling, etc. The conservative estimate is approximately a few times the national licensing quota.

The cost of obtaining foreign waste is very low. It can be sold at a high price through simple process processing and obtain high profits. It is a "honey" for illegal people; but the process to dispose of foreign waste caused serious pollution to the local atmosphere, water, and soil. It is a "poison" that destroys the local ecological environment and endangers the lives and health of the people. The documentaries "Plastic China" and "Beijing Besieged by Waste" told the story about garbage in China, that revealed the poverty and human cost.

Electronic waste transactions began in the eastern coastal areas of China and enabled local farmers to get rich quickly. For example, in Guiyu, Guangdong Province, there are 150,000 people in the town, and 120,000 people are engaged in the e-waste industry. They handle millions of tons of e-waste every year, and the transaction amount is 75 million US dollars. After more than ten years of development of the garbage dismantling industry, Guiyu has already become a wealthy town. However, the wealth of Guiyu has come at the expense of environmental degradation. According to a research report published in 2010, 81.8% of rural children under the age of 6 have lead poisoning, and the source is likely to be lead ash from chip fragmentation or molten lead solder extracted pollution from gold, copper and other precious metals and semi-precious metals. The gold on the circuit board needs to be separated by highly corrosive acids; after the high corrosive acid is used up, it is often poured into rivers and other open waters and further polluted environment, which is a vicious circle for the ecology. The waste ban policy hopefully improves severe circumstances in China and facilitates the healthy development of people and society.

On 5 December 2020, China indicated it intends to ban all solid waste imports starting on 1 January 2021.

== Impact ==
Since 1992, China has received 106 million tons of plastic waste, half of the world's plastic waste imports. After the introduction of the policy, China's imports of plastic waste saw a sharp drop of 99% while the imports of mixed paper have fallen by a third, and imports of aluminum and glass waste have been less affected. In the meantime, many recycling projects abandoned the separation of recyclables when they decided to just dispose of the waste into the same box. This had increased the risk of contamination from food and waste and resulted in a large amount of waste that cannot be reprocessed.

China's economy was highly associated with imported waste since a few decades ago. This rapidly growing economy requires a lot of raw materials to sustain. This is not due to China's technology and ability to recycle these waste but because China's economy is based high on the manufacturing sector which has a high demand for raw materials. Therefore, importing wastes from other countries is actually benefiting China itself. Due to China's large manufacturing industry, it is profitable for China to import waste from other countries. Although the cost of importing waste is only a little bit lower, due to the large quantities of output these factories produce, these small costs add up, yielding a higher return for the industry. The waste import ban in one hand slowly changes China's natural environment (both cons and pros), in another hand influence the global waste exporting countries. Due to the massive amount of wastes these countries import, countries who import waste must develop and better their technology around waste disposal in order to not let these waste cause adverse effects on the environment. Also, after the ban policy, the not accepted wastes force the waste exporting countries to develop better technology to deal with their own domestic wastes. Unexpected, the restricted policy started to influence the recycle industries and raw materials supply industries in China. The raw materials supply faces a gap of millions of tons without the imported waste from foreign countries. The restriction of recycling materials, which banned by China, will eventually forces the industries to use the raw materials. However, using the recycling materials to produce same amount of products are much more energy efficient and material saving than adopting raw materials, which presumably not a good news for the environment. The consequences of insufficient supply of recycling materials are serious, agents have to find materials from other places, for example, perhaps cutting down trees to produce paper. It is also very harmful to the environment.

With the comprehensive recovery of the national economy, the rapid improvement of people's quality of life, and the acceleration of urbanization, major changes have taken place in the generation and treatment of urban domestic waste in China. A waste problem miniature is about the cemetery of "share bicycle" in China which thousands of bikes were discarded in dumping grounds. Also, the rise of the takeaway industry causes 60 million takeaway food containers thrown out across the country. There are hundreds of million tons of wastes produced domestically every year. However, the garbage disposal capacity of most cities has not kept up with the growth rate of garbage. Statistics show that about 40% of the total waste in the country has not been processed centrally. In Japan, waste management is relatively mature than other Asian countries, especially for waste sorting. However, Japan owns the most waste incinerators in the world, the consequence is a lot of air pollution in Japan. The surrounding less developed Asian, for example, Indonesia, facing the waste crisis from the land and ocean. The ocean waste is a global problem, countless marine animals died for eating the plastic products every year. Stacked garbage and improper handling create a good living place for bacteria, causing various diseases in areas with poor sanitation.

=== Europe and the U.S. ===
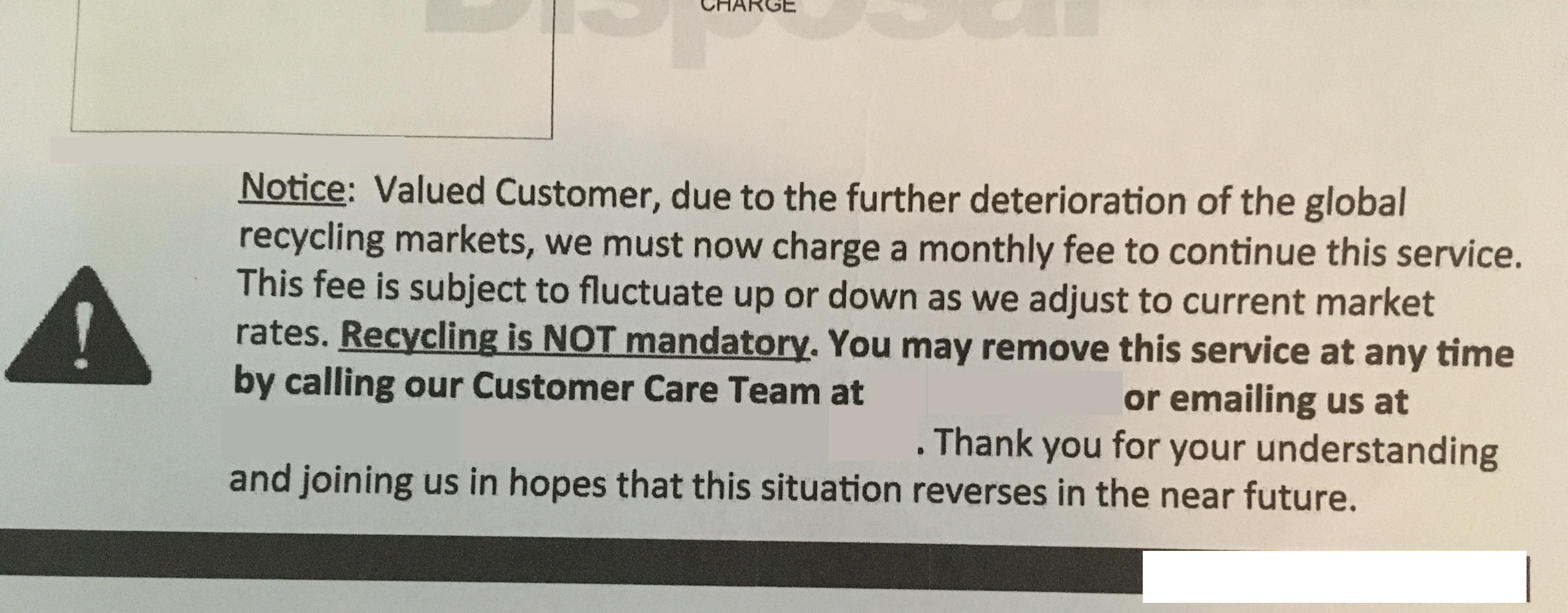
February 2020 announcement of "Deterioration of the global recycling markets" on a U.S. consumer garbage bill

In these more developed countries, the waste was exported to China and other Asian countries to handle before the limited waste import strategies started in most Asian countries. The United States exported about 4,000 shipping containers of garbage to China every day before the waste ban policy. Now the waste is facing by the U.S. itself or it can exporting to other Asian countries which have relatively lower restriction of importing waste. Adina Renee, from Scrap Recycling Industries in a Washington-based institution, stated that "There is no single and frankly, probably not even a group of countries, that can take in the volume that China used to take." Since the ban the US has switched from shipping to China to Thailand, Malaysia, and Vietnam. Reports from these countries state that they are struggling to handle the large increase in plastic waste intake. The United States and other western nations have used China to dispose of the majority of waste for several years. The sudden ban on imports has led many countries to conclude that they are ill-equipped to recycle and manage their own waste output. One of the major issues was that the US and Europe sent China contaminated recyclables which still contained food and could not be processed so these recyclables in turn filled Chinese landfills.

Given that the US is one of the largest producers of waste, the ban has had a great impact on the country. Some US garbage collection services have told customers that "recycling is not mandatory" now that China has stopped accepting the US recyclables, also saying that the recycling service will now incur a separate charge on the consumer's bill. An example of issues resulting from that ban can be seen in Southern California municipalities who had to prepare for large cost constraints as current infrastructure could not compete with the large amounts of waste. In 2016 NAFTA and Europe were the two highest consumers of plastics by developed nations. NAFTA had the largest consumption with 139 kilograms per individual, the greatest overall in the world. The ban will also have the potential to cost the U.S. 6.5 billion in annual exports and remove roughly 150,000 jobs in the industry. Some US municipalities have ceased curbside pickup programs for specific paper and plastics. Robin Wiener, President of the US Institute of Scrap Recycling Industries (ISRI), said that these changes are "a big force for us in raising this issue with the US government".

=== Oceania ===
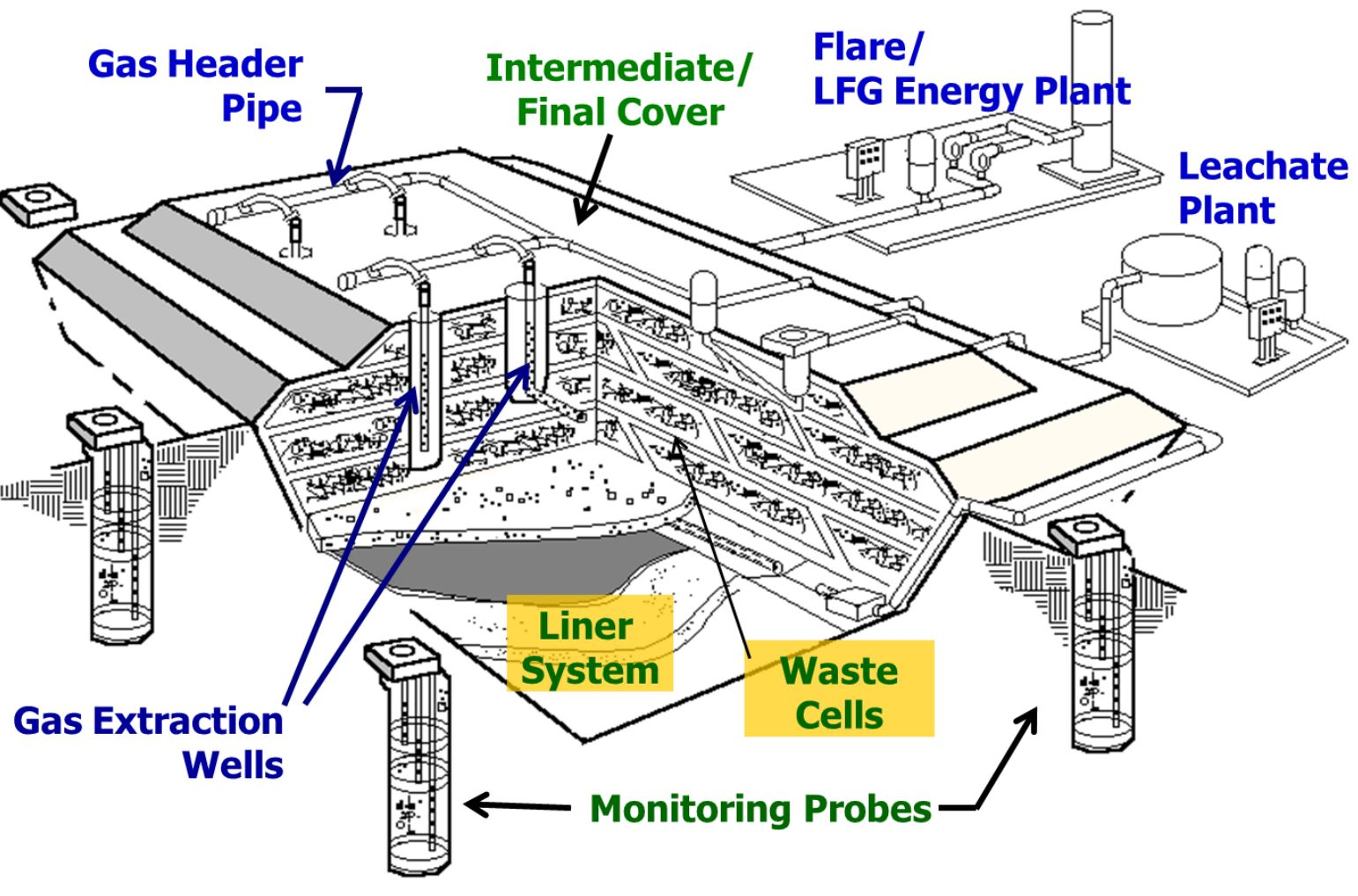
Gas Collection of Landfill

In Australia and New Zealand, the waste managements are based on landfill. The waste handled by landfill in Australia increased by 12% from 2001 to 2007 by statistic data. And the waste disposed of by landfill also increased 100% in Auckland within 10 years. Landfill causes many problems include the pollution on air, water, and agriculture. Methane is a kind of green house gas that mainly produced by decomposition process in landfill. It's about 20 times harmful to the air than carbon dioxide. Australia handled approximately 40 percent of its waste by using the landfill method, which has a very big severe impact on its land. In this case, Australia shipped its waste to China as well. But after China's decision to ban 24 categories of waste, the pressure had been strongly felt by local recyclers and waste management companies. Australia consequently shifted its waste to some less developed countries like India, Malaysia, Vietnam, and Indonesia to decrease its own domestic waste.

Additionally in January 2018, in response to the issue of plastic waste piling up at an alarming rate in landfills after the China ban, Western Australia announced laws to ban all retailers from using lightweight plastic shopping bags after 1 July, 2018. Victoria also declared rolling out its own plastic bag ban within the year. Woolworths and Coles, both big domestic retail companies, had also announced plans in phasing out plastic bags in their stores. By December 2018, the phase-out of light plastic bags had led to an estimated 80% drop in the use of plastic bags nationwide, amounting to 1.5 billion fewer bags entering the environment.

=== Asia ===
Some developed countries have started to transport the waste to other Southeast Asian countries such as Thailand and Malaysia to respond to the ban. Some Chinese manufacturers are also setting up factories in these countries to try to undertake these new projects. However, some of these countries do not have the capacity to respond to the entry of new waste and are already considering whether to impose policies to control the impact of foreign waste on the country. The existing marine pollution of Asia is dire enough, and there is no doubt that transporting waste to countries with no processing capacity will exacerbate this problem.

According to the Financial Times, after the ban on China, the UK's waste exports to Malaysia tripled, and the domestic recycling industry is still sluggish. In addition, China's ban has caused more countries to focus on the development of a recyclable economy. The UK plans to impose a tax on plastic packers, and Norway also requires disposable plastic bottle manufacturers to pay environmental taxes. European authorities have realized the value of plastic waste, claiming that if recycling capacity quadruples, it could create 200,000 jobs by 2030.

From April 2019 onwards, multiple Asian countries including Malaysia, the Philippines, Indonesia, Cambodia and Sri Lanka began sending illegally imported and mislabeled waste back to Western countries.

The surrounding Asian countries like Thailand, Malaysia, Vietnam, and many other countries also influenced by China's ban policy. After the ban policy started in China and before the policy was learned by surrounding Asian countries, the imported trash increased about half times in Indonesia, two times in Vietnam, and tens of times in Thailand. The increasing waste caused many environmental problems such as waste pollution, air pollution, electronic waste pollution, and so on. These countries are big waste importing countries as well but don't have the abilities to recycle and deal with so many wastes, so many of them started to decrease and stop import wastes from western countries to alleviate serious environment problems. However, the waste recycling industry also gradually promote the economic growth in these developing countries. The recycling industry can also facilitate the boom of other related industries such as the waste disposal industry, sewage treatment industry, waste incineration power plants, and so on. The recently concluded Fourth United Nations Environment Programme called on governments to take action to reduce waste generation at the source, conduct sound management in their own countries, and minimize the transboundary movement of waste. It can be traded as general goods if it is a raw material obtained by the harmless processing of solid waste, meets the mandatory national product quality standards, does not endanger public health and ecological safety, and is not a solid waste.

== See also ==
- Global waste trade
- Operation National Sword
- Electronic waste in China
- Plastic roads
- Water pollution
- Waste management
