= Single-stream recycling =

Recycling system

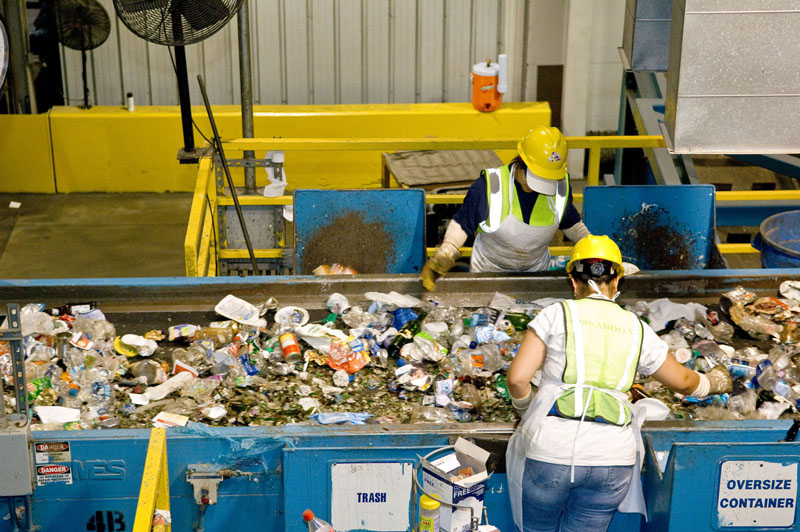
Materials recovery facility in Montgomery County, Maryland

Single-stream (also known as “fully commingled” or "single-sort") recycling refers to a system in which all paper fibers, plastics, metals, and other containers are mixed in a collection truck, instead of being sorted by the depositor into separate commodities (newspaper, paperboard, corrugated fiberboard, plastic, glass, etc.) and handled separately throughout the collection process. In single-stream, both the collection and processing systems are designed to handle this fully commingled mixture of recyclables, with materials being separated for reuse at a materials recovery facility.

The single-stream option replaces the dual-stream option, which is where people separate certain recyclable materials and place them in separate containers for collection. Typically, dual-stream has partial commingled materials such as glass, plastic and metals in one stream separated from paper products in the other stream. From an end consumer perspective, single-stream is easier to participate in. However, single-stream recycling has disadvantages, including the output of lower quality plastics and paper to recyclers. This lower quality material has to be processed more downstream. The increased flow of decreased quality recyclables from Europe and North America in part due to single-stream recycling was part of China's motivation for launching its Operation National Sword policy.

== Advantages ==
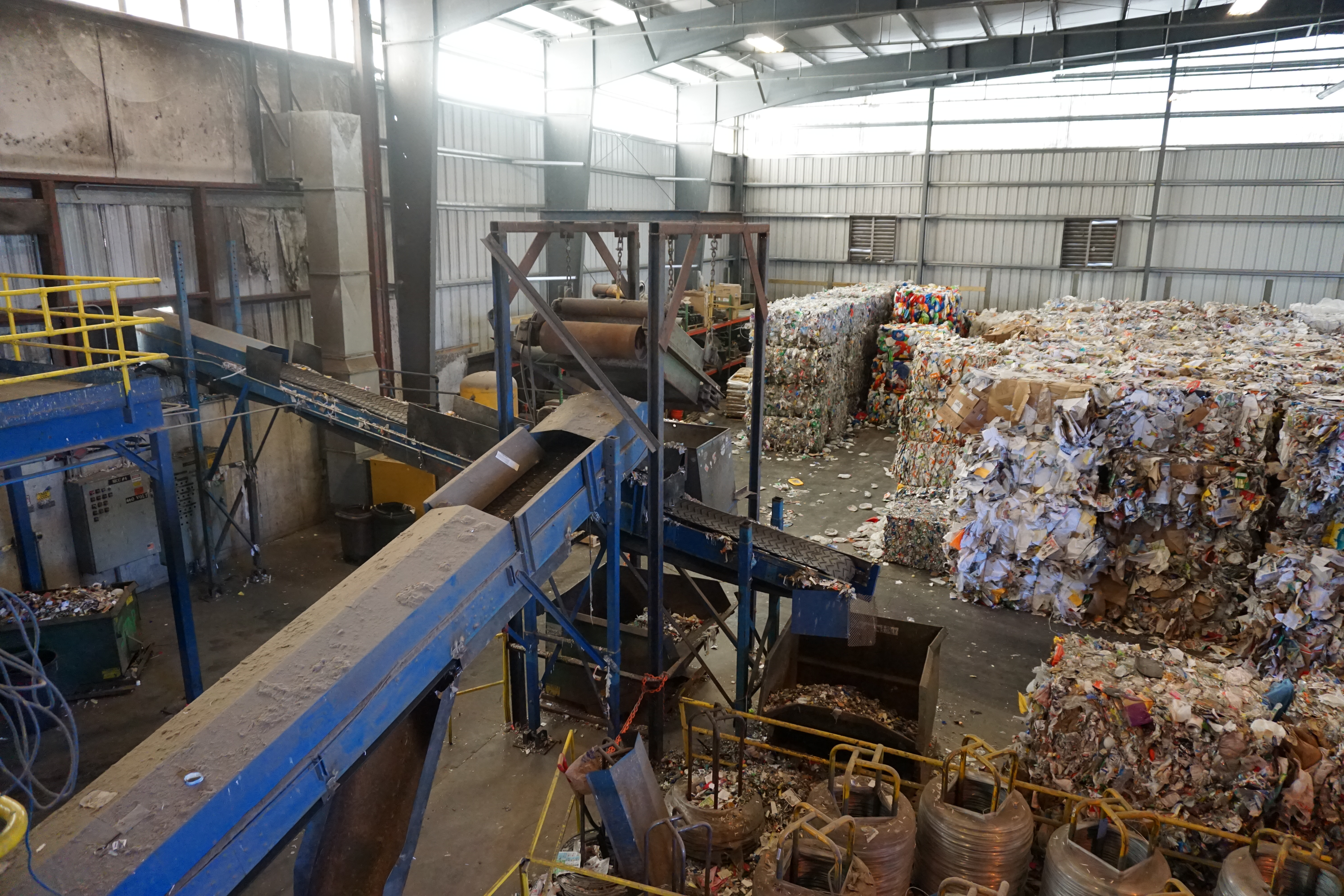
Materials recovery facility in Ann Arbor, Michigan

Proponents of single-stream recycling note several advantages:

- Reduced sorting effort by residents may mean that more recyclables are moved to the curb and more residents may participate in recycling
- Reduced collection costs because single-compartment trucks are cheaper to purchase and operate, collection can be automated, and collection routes can be serviced more efficiently. Single-stream reduced the amount of time it takes for a driver to collect the recyclables, which reduces the driver time on the road.
- Greater fleet flexibility, which allows single-compartment vehicles to be used to collect recycling, providing greater fleet flexibility and reducing the number of reserve vehicles needed. To avoid confusing customers, a large sign or banner is sometimes used to distinguish when a refuse truck is being used to collect recycling (instead of refuse).
- Worker injuries may decrease because the switch to single-stream is often accompanied by a switch from bins to cart-based collection.
- Changing to single-stream may provide an opportunity to update the collection and processing system and to add new materials to the list of recyclables accepted.
- More paper grades may be collected, including junk mail, telephone books and mixed residential paper.

== Disadvantages ==
Potential disadvantages of single-stream recycling may include:

- Initial capital cost for:
  - New carts
  - Different collection vehicles
  - Upgrading the processing facility
- Processing costs may increase compared to multiple-stream systems. Overall, single-stream costs about $3 more per ton than dual-stream.
- Increase of contamination in the recycling container. Possible reduced commodity prices due to contamination of paper or plastic.
- Increased downcycling of paper, i.e., use of high quality fibers for low-end uses like boxboard because of presence of contaminants
- Possible increase in residual rates after processing (chiefly because of increased breakage of glass)
- Potential for diminished public confidence if more recyclables are destined for landfill disposal because of contamination or inability to market materials.

== Single-stream system ==
A single-stream system is a complex network of machinery that uses a combination of newer and older technologies to sort materials for recycling, including PET, HDPE, aluminum, tin cans, cardboard and paper.

List of equipment used in a single-stream system:

1. Back Scraping Drum: spreads materials out on a conveyor belt
2. OCC Screen: sorts cardboard/old corrugated containers (OCC). Cardboard is sent to the Single Ram Baler to be baled.
3. Fines Screen: all material except for cardboard go through Fines Screen. Fines Screen sorts out pieces of glass and fine materials less than five centimetres long. Glass is sent to the Glass Cleanup System for more separating.
4. News Screen: sorts out newspaper from the rest of the recycling.
5. Elliptical Separator: sorts 2D objects from 3D objects.
6. Ferrous Magnet: pulls all ferrous metals to the magnet such as tin cans and steel.
7. Optical Sorter: reads the containers for PET plastic.
8. Eddy current separator: pulls out all of the aluminum and non-ferrous materials.
9. Two-Ram Baler: bales everything except for the cardboard and clear film.
10. Glass Cleanup System: cleans glass coming off fines screen by pulling off all the light fractions.
11. Closed Door Baler: bales the clear film plastic.
12. Motion Floor: walking floor bunkers that stores corrugated and mixed paper.
13. Single Ram Baler: bales all corrugated materials.

== By country ==
=== United States ===
Phoenix, Arizona, began exploring single-stream recycling in 1989. A contract was awarded to CRCInc in 1992, and its MRF, the first large-scale recycling facility to process commingled materials in North America, began operation in 1993. Subsequently, many large and small municipalities across the United States began single-stream programs. As of 2012, there are 248 MRFs operating in the US. As of 2013, 100 million Americans were served by single-stream programs.

== See also ==
- Curbside collection
- List of waste types
- Materials recovery facility
- Resource recovery
- Waste characterization
