= REDcycle =

Australian soft plastic recycling program

- Logo in 2021

The RedCycle or REDcycle program was an Australian soft plastic recycling program started in 2010 by RG Programs and Services and suspended in 2022.

== History ==
Elizabeth Kasell founded RG Programs and Services Pty Ltd, also known as the RED group, launched the REDcycle program in 2010 after wondering why soft plastic could not go in the regular recycling bin. She discovered that, in Australia, traditional sorting machines used in plastic recycling facilities couldn't handle the soft plastic packaging properly and, as a result, soft plastics would either go to the landfill or be sent offshore.

Kasell saw an opportunity for companies to recycle and reuse soft plastics to create new products by disposing and collecting them separately in the first place.

Kasell started implementing a program at her son's school and expanded to a few other primary schools after receiving a Grant from Sustainability Victoria. The program eventually grew to more than 600 collection points all over Australia.

== Collapse ==
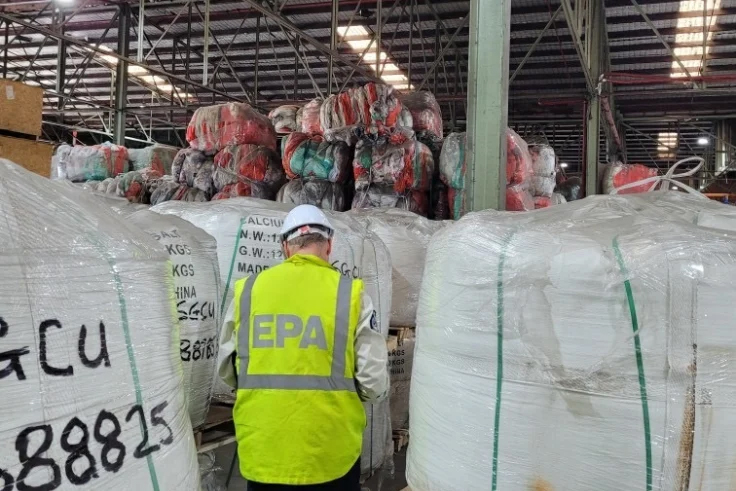
REDcycle soft plastic stockpiles monitored by EPA staff

In November 2022, it was discovered that instead of being recycled the soft plastics were stockpiled in several warehouses across New South Wales, South Australia and Victoria causing an environmental and fire risk. Following the discoveries, REDcycle announced that it would temporarily suspend its activities mentioning that one of their recycling partners had stopped accepting new soft plastics.

In February 2023, RG Programs and Services Pty Ltd, was declared insolvent after not being able to pay the storage fees of the thousands of tonnes of plastics stockpiles all over Australia.

A total of 14 sites storing soft plastics were discovered by EPA Victoria:

- Campbellfield
- Craigieburn (2 sites)
- Dandenong South
- Laverton
- Tottenham (2 sites)
- Truganina (2 sites)
- Tullamarine (2 sites)
- West Footscray
- West Wodonga
- Williamstown North

REDcycle representative explained the stockpiling by pointing out that some recycling facilities were no longer accepting soft plastics since the pandemic of COVID-19 while the amount of soft plastic disposed of increased during that period making it difficult to keep up with little recycling solution.

== Partners ==
=== Recycling partners ===
- Replas, a recycled plastics manufacturer based in Ballarat, Victoria, partnered with RG Programs and Services, to collect and recycle soft plastic packaging into bollards, decking, fencing, garden products and park benches and tables.
- Close the Loop, a company based in Somerton, Victoria, recycling plastic to create recycled asphalt additive for road infrastructure, also known as Tonerplas.
- Plastic Forests, a company based in Albury, NSW, recycling plastic material to create various products including air conditioner mounting blocks and mini wheel stops.

=== Commercial partners ===
RED Group partnered with Coles, one of the two main supermarket chains in Australia, and implemented soft plastic deposit facilities in their stores from 2011. The program helped divert more than 9 million soft plastic packagings from the landfill during its first year in Melbourne's sites, leading to the extension of the program to 370 more Coles store locations around Adelaide, Brisbane, Melbourne and Sydney. In June 2020, Coles and REDcycle reached their 1 billionth soft plastic deposited in store.

By 2014, 15 companies were partners of the REDcycle program:

- AFGC - Australian Food and Grocery Council: an association representing the food and grocery supply industry.
- Australian Packaging Covenant: not-for-profit organisation promoting sustainable packaging.
- Amcor: a global packaging company.
- Arnott's: Australia's largest biscuit producer.
- Birds Eye: international frozen food brand.
- Cadbury subsidiary of Kraft: confectionary brand.
- Coles: large Australian retailer.
- George Weston Foods: Australia and New Zealand's food manufacturer
- Goodman Fielder: Australia, New Zealand and Asia Pacific food company.
- Kellogg's: multinational food manufacturing company.
- Kimberly-Clark: multinational personal care corporation.
- Huggies: company selling baby products, brand owned by Kimberly-Clark.
- RED Group: Australian company funder of the REDcycle program.
- Replas: Australian recycled plastics manufacturer.
- SunRice: Australian rice brand.

Woolworths, the second main Australian supermarket chain, joined the program in 2015.

== Aftermath ==
Following the collapse of the REDcycle program, Aldi Süd, Coles, and Woolworths supermarkets have started cooperating on finding solutions to the soft plastic recycling through the Soft Plastic Taskforce, chaired by the Department of Climate Change, Energy, the Environment & Water. It was announced in February 2024 that 12 locations in Melbourne would offer drop off bins for scrunchable food soft plastic that could be recycled through a newly operated facility.

== Gallery ==
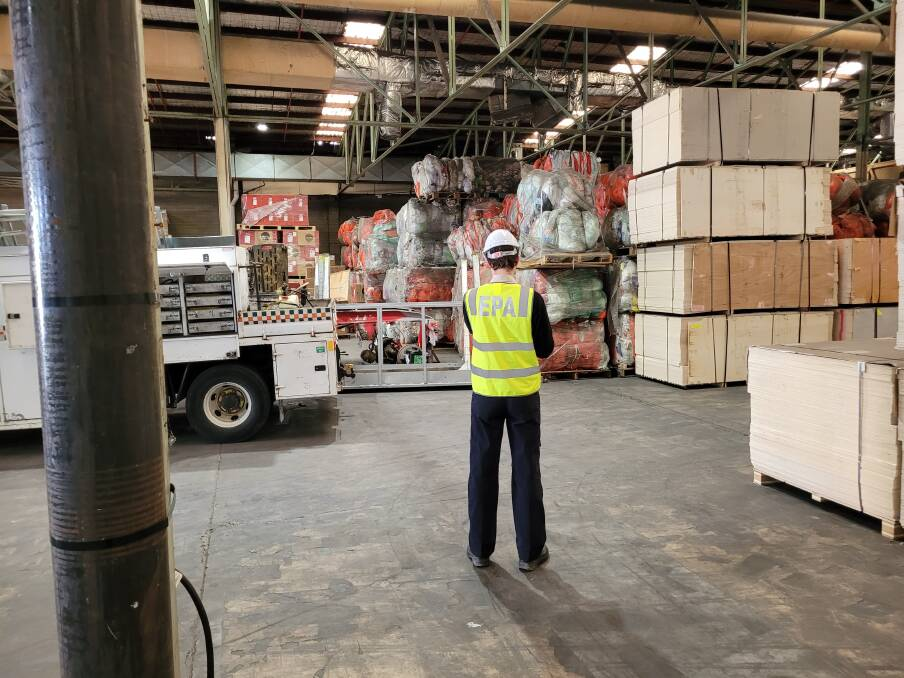
EPA Victoria staff monitoring soft plastic soft piles at REDcycle warehouse

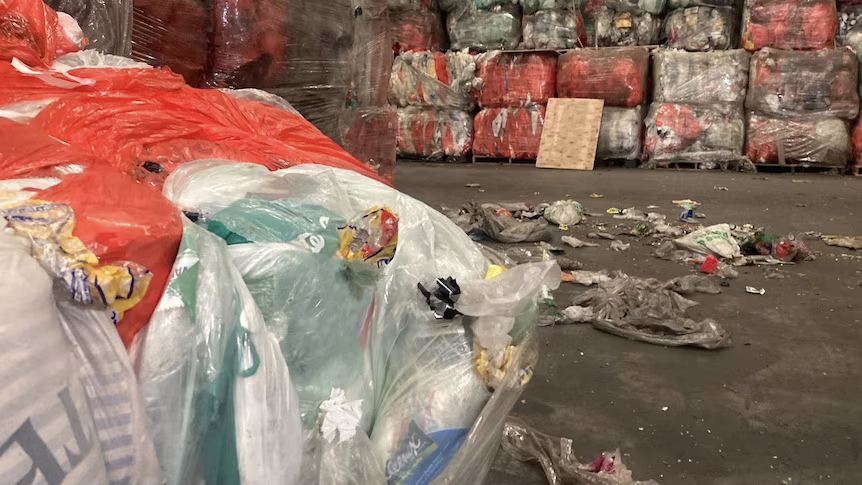
Soft plastic stockpiles and waste on the ground of a REDcycle warehouse

== See also ==
- Environmental issues in Australia
- Recycling in Australia
- Waste management in Australia
