= Chaoyang, Shantou =

Chaoyang 潮阳区
- District
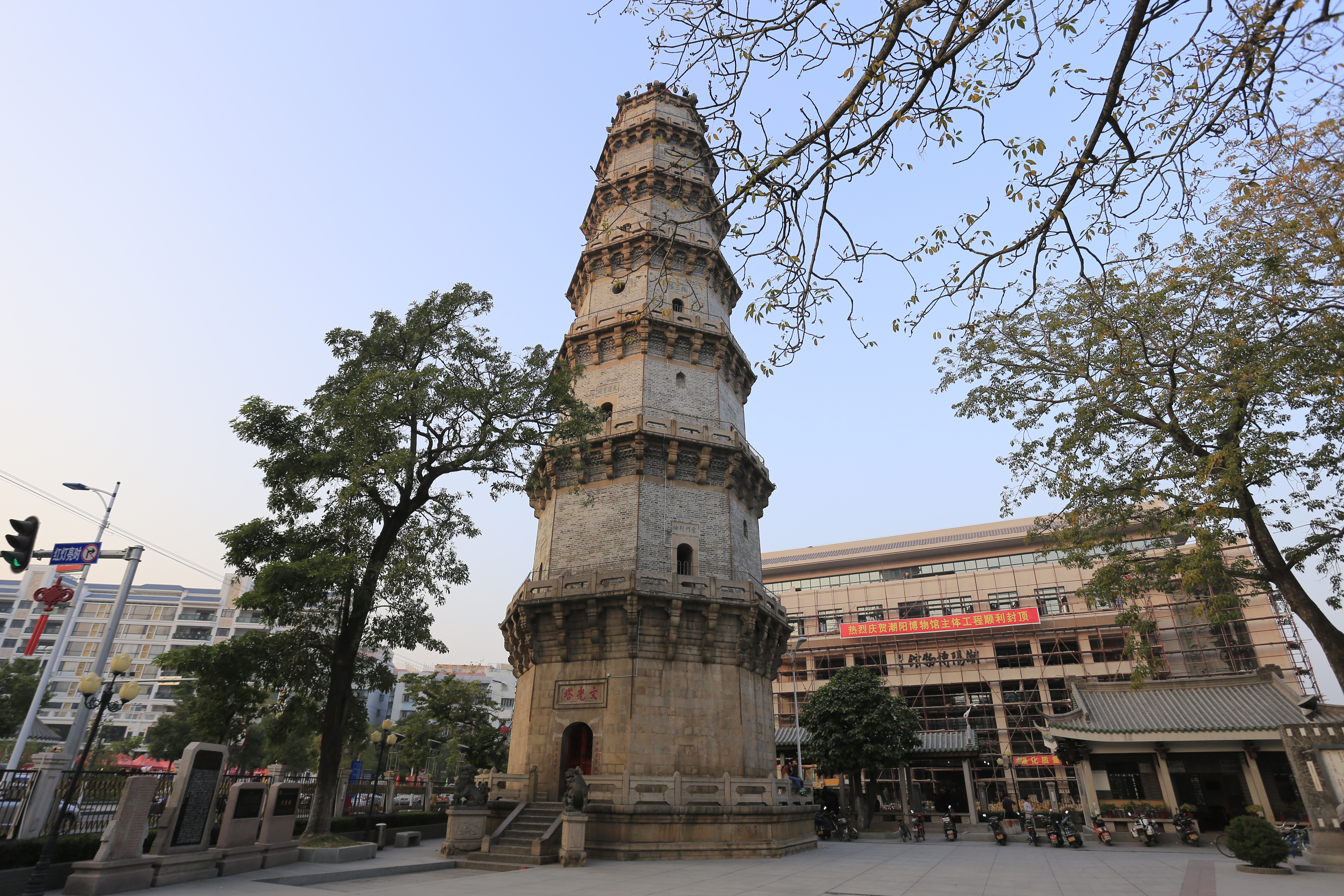
- Chaoyang Wenguang Pagoda

- Location of Chaoyang in Shantou

- Shantou in Guangdong
- Coordinates: 23°15′57″N 116°36′05″E
- Country: People's Republic of China
- Province: Guangdong
- Prefecture-level city: Shantou

Area
  - Total: 667.6 km^{2} (257.8 sq mi)

Population (2020)
  - Total: 1,654,276
  - Density: 2,478/km^{2} (6,418/sq mi)
- Time zone: UTC+8 (China Standard)

Chaoyang District (postal: Chaoyang; simplified Chinese: 潮阳区; traditional Chinese: 潮陽區; pinyin: Cháoyáng Qū), also rendered in English as Teo Yor (variant: Teoyeo, Tioyio, Teoyall), is a district in the municipality of Shantou, Guangdong Province, China.

Chaoyang borders Haojiang District (濠江區) to the east, looks across Niutianyang (牛田洋) toward Jinping District (金平區) to the northeast, adjoins Puning City to the west, is next to Chaonan District to the south, and meets Jieyang City to the north. The region’s mother river, the Lian River, flows east to west through Chaoyang and enters the South China Sea at Haimen Town.

== History ==
The name Teoyeo (the official translation was changed to "Chaoyang" when China standardized the English spelling of its place names through the adoption of the Hanyu Pinyin system, which was officially adopted for international use on January 1, 1979) first appeared in the first year of Long’an of the Eastern Jin (397 CE), when the county was established. Its meaning is "the sunny side of the tides" (潮水之陽). Chao refers to “sea tides” or “tidal waters,” as the area lies to the south by the sea and is strongly influenced by ocean tides. In traditional Chinese geography, yang refers to "the south side of a mountain or the north side of a body of water" (山之南、水之北). Because Chaoyang is located by the coast and lies to the north of the tidal waters (the open sea), it was named Chaoyang.

=== Founding ===
After Qin Shi Huang pacified Nanyue, the Qin administration established Jieyang County (揭陽縣) in the Lingnan region under Nanhai Commandery (南海郡). In the Eastern Jin, during the sixth year of Emperor Cheng’s Xianhe era (331 CE), Jieyang County was formally divided into four counties: Haiyang, Chaoyang, Haining, and Suian. From that point onward, "Jieyang" ceased to exist as a county‑level administrative unit in name and Chaoyang was established.

=== Three Yang of Chaozhou ===
Guangdong’s culture is diverse and is an important heartland of Lingnan culture, while Chaoshan culture forms a major component of Guangdong’s cultural landscape. Since ancient times, Chaozhou has been the cultural center of eastern Guangdong, and historically there was the saying "the Three Yang of Chaozhou" (潮州三陽). Today’s three Chaoshan cities developed from the territory of ancient Chaozhou.

When speaking of Chaoyang, one must also speak of Chaozhou. The name "Chaozhou" originated in the Sui dynasty, when it replaced the former Yian Commandery (義安郡). The name was chosen for its meaning: "a land within the tides, where the tidal waters ebb and flow" (在潮之洲，潮水往復). At that time, Chaozhou administered six counties—Haiyang, Chaoyang, Haining, Chengxiang, Dazhao, and Suian—covering roughly the area of today’s Chaozhou, Meizhou, Shantou, and Shanwei, as well as the southwestern part of Zhangzhou. Suian County, however, was merged into Longxi County shortly after Chaozhou was established and thereafter belonged to Fujian. By the Song dynasty, Chaozhou was part of the Eastern Circuit of Guangnan (廣南東路) and continued to administer the two counties of Haiyang and Chaoyang. Chengxiang County, where Meizhou was later established, originally belonged to Chaozhou. In the tenth year of Shaoxing in the Southern Song (1140 CE), Haiyang County was divided to create Jieyang County again. From then on, Chaozhou generally administered the three counties of Haiyang, Chaoyang, and Jieyang. Because all three county names contained the character 陽 ("yang"), they were collectively known as the Three Yang of Chaozhou.

=== Ming and Qing dynasties ===
During the Ming and Qing dynasties, Chaoyang emerged as one of the most culturally and economically vibrant counties in eastern Guangdong, earning the honorific the Zou and Lu by the seacoast (海濱鄒魯), in reference to the homelands of Confucius and Mencius. The county became known for its strong scholarly tradition, producing a notable number of successful imperial examination candidates, including multiple jinshi. Wenguang Tower (文光塔), originally built in the Song dynasty and reconstructed during the Ming Jiajing and Qing Daoguang eras, stood as a symbol of Chaoyang’s literary prestige. As a coastal frontier, Chaoyang also played a strategic defensive role: its city walls were strengthened during the Ming to counter the threat of wokou (倭寇; lit. pirates), and the Chaoyang county garrison guarded the mouth of the Lian River, Han River and Rong River as part of the empire’s maritime defense network.

With the easing of Qing maritime restrictions, Chaoyang became active in overseas trade, particularly through the “red‑head boats” (紅頭船) that connected local merchants with Southeast Asia. This period saw the beginnings of large‑scale migration from Chaoyang to regions such as Siam (Thailand), Annam (Vietnam), and the Malay world, laying the foundations for influential Teochew communities abroad. Architecturally, many of Chaoyang’s most distinctive ancestral halls and clan compounds date to the Ming and Qing, showcasing refined Teochew craftsmanship in stone, wood, and lacquer. Folk arts—including the Yingge dance and Teochew opera—also flourished during this era, becoming integral parts of local temple festivals. Administratively, Chaoyang County at the time encompassed a much larger area than today, covering what is now Chaoyang District, Chaonan District, and portions of modern Puning and Huilai. For example, in the 14th year of the Hongwu reign of the Ming dynasty (1381), Chaoyang County consisted of sixteen du (administrative divisions). By the late Qing and early Republican period, the autonomous territory of Chaoyang County had been reorganized into nine districts, eight towns, and 143 villages—an area far larger than that of today’s Chaoyang District.

== Administration ==
Population figures given as of the 2003 census.

=== Subdistricts (街道, jiedao) ===
- Wenguang (文光) - pop. 146649
- Mianbei (棉北) - pop. 54942
- Chengnan (城南) - pop. 108651
- Jinpu (金浦) - pop. 79252

=== Towns (镇, zhen) ===
- Haimen (海门) - pop. 115221
- Guanbu (关埠) - pop. 121930
- Heping (和平) - pop. 162174
- Gurao (谷饶) - pop. 135628
- Guiyu (贵屿) - pop. 133727
- Tongyu (铜盂) - pop. 116044
- Jinyu (金玉) - pop. 77977
- Zaopu (灶浦) - pop. 49406
- Xilu (西胪) - pop. 154725
- Hexi (河溪) - pop. 79155

== Famous natives ==
- Chin Sophonpanich, founder of Bangkok Bank
- Cai Chusheng (1906–1968), film director
- Huang Guangyu, Chinese billionaire
- Rocky Cheng Kin Lok (鄭健樂), maturity winner of the Mr. Hong Kong contest in 2005
- Lim Por-yen (林百欣, 1914–2005)
- Bernard Charnwut Chan (陳智思)
- Chan Kam-lam (陳鑑林)
- Ma Wing-shing (馬榮成)
- Frederick Ma (馬時亨)

== Climate ==
Climate data for Chaoyang, elevation 7 m (23 ft), (1991–2020 normals, extremes 1981–present)
Month	Jan	Feb	Mar	Apr	May	Jun	Jul	Aug	Sep	Oct	Nov	Dec	Year
Record high °C (°F)	28.7 (83.7)	29.9 (85.8)	30.7 (87.3)	33.1 (91.6)	35.5 (95.9)	36.7 (98.1)	38.7 (101.7)	37.3 (99.1)	37.1 (98.8)	34.1 (93.4)	32.5 (90.5)	29.3 (84.7)	38.7 (101.7)
Mean daily maximum °C (°F)	19.1 (66.4)	19.5 (67.1)	21.7 (71.1)	25.5 (77.9)	28.7 (83.7)	30.9 (87.6)	32.5 (90.5)	32.3 (90.1)	31.6 (88.9)	29.0 (84.2)	25.4 (77.7)	21.1 (70.0)	26.4 (79.6)
Daily mean °C (°F)	15.1 (59.2)	15.6 (60.1)	17.9 (64.2)	21.8 (71.2)	25.4 (77.7)	27.9 (82.2)	29.2 (84.6)	28.9 (84.0)	28.0 (82.4)	25.2 (77.4)	21.4 (70.5)	17.1 (62.8)	22.8 (73.0)
Mean daily minimum °C (°F)	12.5 (54.5)	13.2 (55.8)	15.4 (59.7)	19.3 (66.7)	23.1 (73.6)	25.7 (78.3)	26.6 (79.9)	26.4 (79.5)	25.5 (77.9)	22.5 (72.5)	18.6 (65.5)	14.3 (57.7)	20.3 (68.5)
Record low °C (°F)	2.5 (36.5)	4.8 (40.6)	4.1 (39.4)	9.3 (48.7)	15.5 (59.9)	18.6 (65.5)	21.7 (71.1)	22.2 (72.0)	18.2 (64.8)	11.6 (52.9)	7.2 (45.0)	1.6 (34.9)	1.6 (34.9)
Average precipitation mm (inches)	37.5 (1.48)	46.6 (1.83)	82.4 (3.24)	156.6 (6.17)	219.1 (8.63)	304.2 (11.98)	238.7 (9.40)	311.8 (12.28)	145.2 (5.72)	36.1 (1.42)	48.1 (1.89)	41.4 (1.63)	1,667.7 (65.67)
Average precipitation days (≥ 0.1 mm)	6.2	8.6	10.6	12.0	14.1	16.7	14.2	14.8	9.3	4.1	4.5	6.2	121.3
Average relative humidity (%)	72	76	77	79	81	83	80	80	75	68	71	70	76
Mean monthly sunshine hours	155.6	118.9	117.8	132.7	156.6	174.4	239.9	221.7	215.2	226.0	186.7	170.8	2,116.3
Percentage possible sunshine	46	37	31	35	38	43	58	56	59	63	57	52	48
Source: China Meteorological Administrationall-time November high
