= Lian River (Chaoshan) =

River in Guangdong, China

Coordinates: 23.2893°N 116.3650°E

Lian River (simplified Chinese: 练江; traditional Chinese: 練江; pinyin: Lianjiang) is a coastal river in eastern Guangdong Province. The Lianjiang River gets its name from its winding, ribbon-like course. In classical Chinese, "lian" (練) refers to the process of repeatedly boiling and rinsing raw silk or cloth in water to remove impurities, making it soft, white, and lustrous. This process was called "lian" (湅) in ancient times, and the resulting soft, white silk was simply called "lian" (練) .

The river originates in Baishuiji (白水漈) of Puning City, with its source at Hanma Path (寒媽徑) on Wufeng Mountain (五峰山), and flows through Chaonan District (潮南區) of Shantou before entering the sea at Haimen Bay (海門灣) in Haimen Town (海門鎮), Chaoyang District of Shantou. It is commonly referred to as an important river for Chaoyang District, Chaonan District, and Puning City. The river is approximately 71–72 kilometers long, with a drainage basin of about 1,353 square kilometers. Within Chaoyang District, the river runs for roughly 40 kilometers and drains an estimated 839 square kilometers. It was one of the most polluted rivers in China.

== Course ==
In Puning City, the upper reaches of the Lianjiang flow through the Liusha urban area (流沙市區), Chiwei Subdistrict (池尾街道), Dananshan Town (大南山鎮), Zhanlong Town (占隴鎮), Nanjing Town (南徑鎮), Qilin Town (麒麟鎮), Xiajia Mountain Town (下架山鎮), Junbu Town 軍埠鎮(), Liaoyuan Town (燎原鎮), Daba Town (大壩鎮), Yunluo Town (雲落鎮), and Meitang Town (梅塘鎮). In Chaonan District, the river passes Chendian Town (陳店鎮), Simapu Town (司馬浦鎮), Xiashan Subdistrict (峽山街道), Jingdu Town (井都鎮), and Lugang Town (臚崗鎮). In Chaoyang District, it flows through Guiyu Town (貴嶼鎮), Tongyu Town (銅盂鎮), Heping Town (和平鎮), Jinpu Subdistrict (金浦街道), Miancheng (棉城), and Haimen Town (海門鎮). The Lianjiang River basin has a population of over 2 million, with a population density several times higher than the provincial average, placing enormous pressure on the environment.

== Pollution ==
The pollution of the Lianjiang River did not occur overnight. As early as 1998, a pollution source survey showed that there were 95 major industrial pollution sources in the Lianjiang River basin. The dyeing and textile industries in Puning, Chaoyang, and Chaonan had a very high pollution load, while the industrial wastewater treatment rate in Chaoyang City that year was only 13.75%. In other words, a large amount of untreated industrial wastewater flowed directly into the Lianjiang River.

== Remediation Efforts ==
=== Flood control ===
Lianjiang, originally named Liusha River (流沙河), originates from Huihan Market (暉含墟) in Puning and merges with a tributary of Baikeng Lake (白坑湖). Due to its short channel, small drop, meandering course, and poor drainage, it frequently suffers from severe flooding. During droughts, seawater intrusion causes large-scale salinization. After the 1950s, the government implemented comprehensive management measures, including building reservoirs in the upper reaches and tributaries; dredging the main stream at 16 locations, straightening and shortening the channel by 23.4 kilometers; and implementing flood control measures at the foot of the mountains, effectively controlling floods and droughts. Bridges and sluice gates were built at Haimen, eliminating salinization.

In recent years, due to rapid population growth and the rapid development of township enterprises, Lianjiang has become severely polluted, and its irrigation and water supply functions have gradually been lost. Historically, Lianjiang was also an important waterway for transportation. Wooden boats could travel along the tributaries of Baikeng Lake into Chendian Town (陳店鎮), while small steamboats could travel 44 kilometers downstream from Chendian. To connect Lianjiang with the Rongjiang and Hanjiang rivers, the Miancheng Canal (棉城運河), in Teochew it is called Aokoi (後溪; Teochew: ao6 koi1 or hao6 koi1; lit. "Back Creek" or "Rear Stream") was built during the Ming Dynasty. This 7.5-kilometer-long canal connects Lianjiang and Niutianyang. This allowed ships to safely and quickly reach Jieyang and Haiyang without having to detour through international waters, bringing significant economic benefits.

=== Pollution control ===
In 1988, the then Chaoyang County government mobilized social forces and raised 5.0567 million yuan for the treatment of the Lianjiang River. Although this was a significant investment at the time, the process of treating the Lianjiang River, which had long been plagued by pollution, was extremely lengthy and arduous. In 1997, the river was included in the Guangdong Environmental Protection Bureau’s "Clean Water Project" (碧水工程計劃). In 2001, the Guangdong Provincial Government issued a Lianjiang River Basin Water Quality Protection Plan (練江流域水質保護), setting targets for pollutant control and water-quality improvement.

In April 2004, the Shantou Municipal Government formulated the "Implementation Plan for the Comprehensive Improvement Project of the Lian River Basin in Shantou City" (汕頭市練江流域綜合整治工程實施方案) to invest 1.943 billion yuan within 6 years to build 14 sewage treatment plants and 14 centralized landfills for domestic waste, so as to achieve full compliance with water quality standards in the Lian River. Between 2018 and 2020, in response to public concerns about insufficient progress in water quality management, provincial and local governments intensified their efforts. Monitoring data from early 2020 showed that the river's water quality had reached the Class V surface water standard.

== Governance Challenges ==
Because the Lian River flows through both Puning City and Shantou City, coordination across jurisdictions has been a recurring issue. Besides the mindset of the government and business owners, residents also commonly hold the idea that "others are already polluting so badly, what difference does it make if I'm one less." Garbage is often not disposed of at designated locations or times, and there are frequent instances of dumping and burning garbage along the banks of the Lian River. Remediation requires substantial financial resources, and public awareness of environmental management in the basin has been identified as an area for continued improvement.

In a 2009 proposal, Wu Xiyan, a member of the Guangdong Provincial Committee of the Chinese People’s Political Consultative Conference (CPPCC) from Chaoyang, criticized the remediation of the Lianjiang as being largely superficial. He pointed out that local governments and relevant departments attached importance to the issue in words and on paper, but were lax in concrete action and implementation, often citing numerous difficulties and excuses. According to his proposal, many business operators had a weak sense of legal compliance, especially with respect to environmental impact assessment laws. A mentality of "taking chances" and "the law cannot punish everyone" persisted, and illegal discharges or the unauthorized installation of polluting production processes remained common despite repeated crackdowns.

== See also ==
Guiyu Town
