= Waste Tide =

2013 science fiction novel by Chen Qiufan

- Author: Chen Qiufan
- Language: Chinese
- Genre: Science fiction
- Publisher: Changjiang Literature & Art Press 长江文艺出版社
- Publication date: 2013
- Publication place: China
- ISBN: 9787535462398

Waste Tide is a science fiction novel by the Chinese writer Chen Qiufan. It was his debut novel.

== Writing background ==
The story takes place in the imaginary ''Silicon Isle''. The Chinese word ''硅屿'' for Silicon Isle shares a similar pronunciation with Guiyu (Chinese: 贵屿) in Mandarin. In the real world, Guiyu is a town in the Shantou prefecture of Guangdong province in southern China; Shantou is also where Chen Qiufan was born and grew up before he entered Peking University.

The novel is based on the electronic waste recycling site in Guiyu, which at the time of the novel's writing was a symbol of the toxicity of consumer electronics, and, as academic Jessica Imbach writes, "the capitalist exploitation of informal and cheap labour in the Global South." Guiyu held the record for being the largest E-waste site up to 2013. Though some residents got rich by electronic recycling, pollution became serious in the town.

Talking about the background of writing the novel, Chen said: ''Choosing my hometown as background to write the story, is related to my thinking of China. To depict the pain of changing China, is just because I desire for she getting better gradually.''

== Setting ==
Waste Tide depicts a dystopian China in the post-2020 era. It is a cyberpunk setting. On Silicon Isle, the large electronic waste recycling industries are controlled by local lineage associations. Migrant laborers, known to the locals as "waste people," are exploited by three families of Silicon Isle natives in a toxic environment that destroys their health. The waste people dismantle plastic and electronic parts from cybernetic implants and augmentations, robots, and other discarded pieces of advanced technology.

== Plot ==
After a decade away from Guiyu working as an interpreter for American recycling executive Scott Brandle, Kaizong returns home to find the city overcome with e-waste pollution.

Brandle has come to Guiyu to persuade local officials to have his billion-dollar American recycling company take over the island to fix its waste problems.

Kaizong falls in love with Mimi and reconnects with his family.

Mimi is a 'waste girl', a member of the lowest caste on Silicon Isle. Located off China's southeastern coast, Silicon Isle is the global capital for electronic waste recycling, where thousands of people like Mimi toil day and night, hoping that one day they too will get to enjoy the wealth they've created for their employers, the three scrap families who have ruled the isle for generations.

It all changes when a ship bearing a dangerous cargo arrives at Silicon Isle. What looks like normal e-waste is actually infected by a virus born out of one of the darkest episodes of World War II, Project Waste Tide. Mimi is exposed to the virus, which attaches itself to her brain via a helmet. She becomes a powerful cyborg with the ability to project her consciousness into machines, which she uses to oppose the corrupt system on Silicon Isle. A class war ignites, one that draws in environmental extremists and waste workers, and involves family feuds and darker conspiracies.

Mimi sacrifices herself to the struggle, leaving the rallying cry that "I am just the beginning."

== Themes ==
The novel critiques principles of free trade. Academic Zoe Goldstein writes that the novel "showcases an alternative to both the governance of global free trade and coercive environmentalism." Goldstein observes that despite the novel's cyberpunk setting, it leans away from the pessimism that typifies the genre.
