= Operation National Sword =

Chinese government initiative to reduce imports of unrecyclable waste

The Operation National Sword (ONS) was a policy initiative the government of China launched in 2017 to monitor and more stringently review imports of recyclable waste. By 1 January 2018, China had banned 24 categories of solid waste and had also stopped importing plastic waste with a contamination level of above 0.5 percent, which was significantly lower than the 10 percent that it had previously allowed. Before the policy, China was importing the vast majority of recyclables from North America and Europe for two decades. This practice of buying recyclables brought raw materials for the growing industrial capacity of China, but also brought a lot of contaminated recyclables which ended up accumulating in China, causing other environmental concerns such as air and water pollution.

China first brought awareness of its intention to limit its imports of contaminated waste and recyclables back in 2013, through its Operation Green Fence program, which consequently impacted Western waste exporters negatively. The latter ONS policy was interpreted as an international relations move by China against Western countries. The policy caused a ripple effect in the global recyclables market, causing major pile ups in Western countries who had been collecting lower quality recyclables in single-stream recycling, and displacing some of those recyclable to other countries, mostly in South East Asia, like Vietnam and Malaysia.

Since 2026, China has gradually restarted the import of foreign waste due to increased recycling capacity.

== Background ==
The Chinese government implemented the Operation Green Fence in February 2013. This initiative predates Operation National Sword, as it was already launched as an aggressive inspection effort aimed at reducing the amount of contaminated recyclables and waste that was being sent to the country.

== Implementation ==
In April 2017, Chinese Communist Party general secretary Xi Jinping, in a speech during the 34th meeting of the Reform Enforcement Task Force, emphasized the country's focus on environmental issues related to foreign "waste". China then notified the World Trade Organization (WTO) on 18 July 2017 that it intended to ban additional "solid waste" imports by year-end. This includes plastics waste, unsorted waste paper and waste textile materials. The Chinese government also announced that the percentage of contaminants allowed in recycled materials would drop from 5–10% to 0.5%. In March 2018, the National Sword policy came into effect, banning the import of 24 categories of scrap materials, including low-grade plastics and unsorted mixed paper.

== Impact ==
After the implementation of the policy, a knock-on effect was caused on the amount of plastic accepted for import by Chinese re-processors. Immediately after the Chinese notification in July 2017, organizations such as the Institute of Scrap Recycling Industries and the Bureau of International Recycling warned that this action would cause job losses, shut down many recycling facilities, and send more waste to landfills. The ONS encouraged the Western world to turn to nations like Malaysia, the Philippines, Cambodia, Thailand, and India, among other countries. However, by early 2019, many Southeast Asian countries also started to reject the waste as well. A 2018 study estimated that ONS could displace an estimated 111 million tons of discarded plastic by 2030.

=== Impact on plastic recycling ===
One of the main reasons that China implemented the 2017 National Sword Policy was to decrease the importation of low-quality plastics that are hard to sort and recycle and were accumulating in trash dumps and at recyclers. Before the ban, 95% of plastics collected in the European Union and 70 percent of plastics exported from the U.S. were sent to mainland China and Hong Kong. Most of these plastics were low quality, because of single-stream collection and increased complexity of separating different colors and types of plastic.

Upon implementation of the policy in 2017, plastic imports to China plummeted by 99%. This led to waste stream backlogs across Europe and North America. When they could find buyers, most European plastic was diverted to Indonesia, Turkey, India, Malaysia, and Vietnam.

== See also ==
- China waste import ban
