= Electronic waste in China =

Electronic waste or e-waste in China refers to electronic products that are no longer usable and are therefore dumped or recycled. China is the world's largest importer and producer of electronic waste with over 70% of all global e-waste ending up in the world's largest dumpsites. An estimated 60–80% of this e-waste is handled through illegal informal recycling processes, without the necessary safety precautions legally required by Chinese government regulations. Processing e-waste in this way directly causes serious environmental damage and permanent health risks in areas surrounding the disposal sites. While the Chinese government and the international community have taken action to regulate e-waste management, ineffective enforcement, legislative loopholes, and the pervasiveness of informal recycling have been obstacles to mitigating the consequences of e-waste.

== Sources ==
=== Domestic ===
China's domestic contribution of e-waste is substantial. The Global E-waste Monitor 2020 report found that the amount of annual domestic e-waste generation in China alone reaches approximately 10.1 million tons, thus overtaking the U.S. as the largest e-waste producing country. This overtaking was expected given China's rising economic development, technical innovation, and urbanization as more electronics are being created, consumed, and disposed. E-waste from computers, mobile phones, and other electronics is expected to rise to 27.22 million tons by 2030, growing at an average annual rate of 10.4% as the fastest growing waste stream in China.

The major sources of e-waste processed in China are households, domestic institutions such as schools and hospitals, government agencies and businesses, and equipment manufacturers. This e-waste is usually channeled through: second-hand markets where reusable devices can be re-sold at reasonable prices, (illegal) donation systems that send used home appliances to poorer rural areas of western China, or through peddlers who re-sell e-wastes to dealers. The third channel is the most common form of e-waste management in China, which creates a massive informal sector.

=== Foreign ===
Large amounts of foreign e-waste, mostly from the developed Western world, have been imported into China since the 1970s. Cheaper labor and lax environmental standards attracted e-waste from developed countries that could save much of the cost of processing the waste domestically. By 2000, China was the largest importer of e-waste in the world. According to United Nations data, about 70% of electronic waste globally generated ended up in China,” said Ma Tianjie, a spokesman for the Beijing office of Greenpeace. In January 2018, the Chinese government implemented a waste import ban which Hong Kong has not enforced. Since the resumption of China’s One Country, Two Systems policy in 1997, Chinese policies only prevent e-waste from entering mainland China but not for licensed imports at Hong Kong ports. From Hong Kong, e-waste can be easily transported to the mainland or exported to other countries and back into China via illegal channels.

A 2013 study by the United Nations Environment Programme (UNEP) examining the e-waste trade showed that most of the e-waste originating in developed countries, such as the US, Japan, Korea, and various countries in the European Union (EU), was illegally bound for developing countries, including China. According to the study, 976,500 tonnes of illegal waste, including e-waste, was seized by Chinese authorities in 2013. In the same year, 211 cases of waste smuggling were halted by Chinese authorities.

== Recycling methods ==
=== Formal ===
According to a study done in 2020, China’s formal e-waste recycling industry is quite developed, following strict regulations, governmental incentives, and the development and expansion of recycling facilities. The formal recycling process practices safe methods of handling the waste and allows for the recovery of precious raw materials, which can later be reused in other manufacturing. E-waste recycling processes typically consist of the following steps: collection, storage, sorting/dismantling/shredding, separation, and recovery. E-waste is collected from enterprises or manufacturers and safely stored in recycling facilities until they are manually dismantled and sorted into categories of what to discard and what to recover. The smaller electronic parts are further separated into their specific materials using water and magnets, and finally, the desired components can be recovered and restored for future use. Despite the thoroughness of this formal recycling process, it is reported to be only about 40% efficient.

=== Informal ===
A main contributor to China’s e-waste problem is that the majority of e-waste dumped in China - reports vary between 60% and 80% - is handled through illegal informal recycling processes. Unlike China’s formal methods, informal e-waste recycling is extremely unregulated and unsafe, remaining a profitable market due to cheap labor and a high demand for the disposal of electronics. The informal sector consists of a system of small-scale, often family-run workshops and “backyard” recycling, usually performed by marginalized groups of the population. Peddlers travel from door-to-door and buy unwanted electronics, later reselling them to informal e-waste recyclers. The informal recycling process is often done in the open and uses extremely rudimentary methods such as stripping metals by hand, burning toxic materials, disposing parts in bodies of water, and more. To keep operations running, these informal practices are typically carried out in suburban areas, where there is a lack of effective enforcement and control.

== Environmental and health impacts ==
=== Environmental ===
While the formal e-waste recycling process in China is contained and regulated, the overwhelming informal sector causes serious environmental hazards. Crude recycling methods, especially the burning of materials, release massive amounts of toxic chemicals like lead, chromium, cadmium, and more. Studies conducted in China report that the soil, air, water, and entire ecosystems near informal recycling sites and e-waste landfills are highly contaminated by these dangerous substances. The air around the vicinity of informal e-waste recycling was found to have particles with high amounts of heavy metals, 100 times greater than normal levels. The pollution of dirt, however, is not contained to only the immediate recycling areas. Studies have found contaminants in the soil of rice fields and duck ponds with toxicity levels failing to meet many international agricultural safety standards. Further, toxins travel through bodies of water from the informal recycling sites, with scientists consistently finding heavy metals in the water, sediment, and even fish. It is predicted that these contaminants will have lasting effects on the environment and allow for the possibility of the formation of more dangerous substances in the future.

=== Health ===
Lacking the proper methods and necessary safety precautions, informal e-waste recycling is directly responsible for worsening the health of many in China. Since the pollutants that are released during the process travel, the effects on health are widespread. Firstly, those who reside around informal sites experience second-hand exposure to the hazardous e-waste remnants through inhalation, digestion, and skin contact. The workers who directly handle breaking down electronics, often women and children, experience the most harm. Informal workshops are usually not well-ventilated and workers wear little-to-no protective equipment, resulting in direct exposure to toxic substances that can cause severe developmental problems and have been linked to increased chances of cancer. Studies on informal e-waste workers in China showed extremely high levels of hazardous materials in their systems - the highest concentration in humans ever recorded. There is rising concern for the health of children who are exposed, as their potential health risk is measured to be 8 times higher than that of adult e-waste workers due to their smaller size and higher ingestion rate. Scientists are continuing to perform more research on the long-term effects of handling e-waste, focusing especially on pregnant women and children.

=== Affected regions ===
Most of China's informal recycling sectors are limited to regions along the southeastern coast of China. The main region where the e-waste is shipped to is the Guangdong province, situated along China's south east coast. From there e-waste is spread to other regions such as Zhejiang, Shanghai, Tianjin, Hunan, Fujian and Shandong for processing. E-waste disposal operations frequently occur in the suburban areas, due to the lack of effective enforcement and control.

==== Guiyu ====
Guiyu in Guangdong Province is the location of the largest electronic waste site on earth. Specializing in informal e-waste recycling for over 30 years, e-waste has become a pillar of the local economy in Guiyu. The town has up to 5,000 workshops treating up to 70 percent of the world's e-waste, and employing around 100,000 people; electronic waste lines most of the streets and reports indicate that the smell of burning metal and plastic are constantly in the air. The disposal sites recycle 15,000 tons of e-waste on a daily basis. Over 80 per cent of the town's residents make a living off of manually disassembling and disposing e-waste full-time. The residents of Guiyu are known to have the highest reported level of lead and dioxin found in people globally. These high dioxin levels also result in much higher miscarriage rates for women that are pregnant and reports show that over 70 percent of children have high lead levels in their bloodstreams. In 2012, Guiyu authorities published a decree that banned burning of electronic waste as well as soaking electronic waste in sulfuric acid.

==== Taizhou ====
The Taizhou region of the Zhejiang province is also a major e-waste recycling center. Taizhou's residents are especially vulnerable to the contamination of their large agricultural sector caused by the e-waste sector. Taizhou has been a major site for soil and sediment pollution by toxins generated from e-waste disposal. Residents of Taizhou also have a high dietary intake of heavy metals through rice, vegetable, and water consumption. In 2012, their average intake of heavy metals was 3.7 mg/(day$kg bw), exceeding the FAO tolerable daily intake of 3.6 mg/day$kg bw.

== Legislation and regulation ==
=== National legislation ===
A variety of environmental legislations and programs have been issued by the Chinese government in order to regulate the electronic product production and e-waste management sectors.

Effective February 1, 2000, the Ministry of Environmental Protection (MEP) passed a regulation entitled Notification on Importation of the Seventh Category of Wastes. This regulation prohibits e-waste from being an allowed importation under the seventh category of waste approved by the MEP. On July 1, 2004, Measures on the Administration of Business Certificate on Hazardous Materials required businesses to acquire a license to legally collect, store, or dispose of e-waste. Additionally, previous legislation was revised in 2005 to firmly disallow imports of solid waste from entering China for the purpose of dumping.

In 2008, the MEP passed Administrative Measures for the Prevention and Control of Environmental Pollution by Electronic Waste - a set of administrative rules requiring all e-waste treatment enterprises to adopt pollution control techniques and register with local government agencies. Under this act, violators are subject to heavy fines of up to ¥500,000 ($73,000).

In 2011, the Collection and Treatment Decree on Wastes of Electric and Electronic Equipment strengthened national standards for the e-waste treatment sector, setting minimum annual treatment capacities for formal e-waste treatment enterprises. These new set of laws also required treatment plants to adopt pollution prevention principles during the entire disposal process in order to minimize negative environmental impacts.

In 2012, China adopted the extended producer responsibility (EPR) system from the EU, which held manufacturers responsible for the collection and recycling of electronics. Otherwise known as “Producer Takeback,” the EPR management system requires manufacturers to carry out environmentally safe management of their products even after they are discarded. The Measure on Tax Levy and Use for E-waste Recycling was implemented on manufacturers to officially enact the EPR system.

=== Legislative inadequacies ===
The Chinese government has long been aware of the environmental and health consequences of electronic waste, and was one of the first global supporters of banning exports of e-waste to developing countries. The failures of China’s legislation have come from its inexperience of how to manage e-waste and its overall ambiguous, contradictory legislation [17]. Imports often walk the line between illegal smuggling and legal import, as judicial authorities that enforce regulations struggle with ambiguities and contradictions in the regulations [17]. For example, waste imports that are marked as “recycling copper or aluminum” would be a legal import under the Notification on Importation of the Seventh Category of Wastes, creating a loophole for e-waste to legally enter China for many years.

Though legislation and regulations have been accepted by the developed countries against illegal exportation of e-waste, the high number of illegal shipments continues to exacerbate the e-waste problem in China. For instance, the members of the EU agreed not to transport any waste subject to the Basel Convention out of the EU or the OECD but illegal shipments are still rising in China and other developing countries. One of the main incentives for them to export e-waste is that the cost of domestic e-waste disposal is higher than the exportation fees. Moreover, e-waste brokers make large profits from the trade and get paid twice: once for acquiring the e-waste, once for shipping it.

Informal e-waste recycling in China is so prevalent that it makes regulatory programs less effective. Regulatory pilot projects usually fail to collect sufficient e-waste because they do not incentivize consumers to safely dispose of their end-of-life electronics. Even though many Chinese consumers realize that it is important to recycle e-waste safely, they still value the monetary value of their products and choose informal recycling instead. As many as 90% of the consumers are reluctant to pay for e-waste recycling because there is still monetary value in the end-life of products. While electronic devices and waste are collected in different Chinese regions and impart various environmental and health problems on the area, many activists argue that the distributors and source countries are not being held significantly responsible. While international regulations have increased domestic recycling programs in these source countries (such as the United States), shipment of Electronic Waste has not completely been eradicated and remains a significant global issue.

=== Provincial programs ===
Along with national legislation, several provincial programs have been set in place to address e-waste management issues in more urgent regions, such as the Guangdong, Qingdao, Beijing and the Sichuan provinces. Many of these programs have been aimed at controlling the informal sector and strengthening formal e-waste channels. Waste collections systems and storage points for e-waste have been created in villages with larger disposal sites. In the regions of Tianjin, Taicing, Ningbo, Taizhou and Zhangzhou, local recycling parks have been built in which informal laborers still work as manual recyclers, but under production and pollution management. In Guiyu, the government promoted technical upgrades in informal workshops by replacing coal-fired grills with electrical heaters that would reduce the amount of leaked toxins when treating circuit boards.

In June 2009, China initiated the "Home Appliance Old for New Rebate Program", which first launched in nine cities and provinces considered to be more economically developed. It restricted the collection of old appliances by accredited household appliance retailers. These authorized collectors would be able to pay consumers a higher price for their e-waste as well as compensate them with discount coupons for new devices. By April 2011, about 46.6 million old home electrical appliances were collected along with the sale of 45 million new ones. This initiative resulted in the rapid growth of the formal waste electronic and electric equipment recycling industry. It reduced e-waste recycling based on private individual collection, and increased collection by formal entities through large-scale delivery and rational distribution with a centralized and statistical information system.

=== Corporate initiatives ===
In order to establish a normative e-waste recycling network, the National Development and Reform Commission (NDRC) designated Qingdao Haier, Hangzhou Dadi, Beijing Huaxing, and other companies, as the national e-waste collection and recycling pilot projects in 2004. These projects, along with the United Nations Environment Program were a failure due to the fact that they could not get adequate e-waste collected for efficient operations.

Many companies, like Nintendo, are aware of the problem of e-waste and are developing their own initiatives such as creating collective e-waste reclamation campaigns.

China Mobile, Motorola, and Nokia collaborated in launching a recycling program where they took back used cellphones and electronic accessories. This “take-back,” or “Green Box” program safely collected about 20 tons of e-waste by 2009.

In response to low incentives some companies, like Dell, started to provide compensations to consumers in Beijing and Shanghai of US$0.15 for 1 kg of old computer. In order to receive the incentive consumers had to bring their used computers to local Dell stores at their own expense. The project failed because the financial gains of returning their computer to formal recyclers were lower than the gains from selling computers to informal collectors.

== International agreements ==
=== Basel Convention ===
In 1992, the United Nations Basel Convention was established to control the transboundary movement and disposal of hazardous waste. The Basel Convention makes up the global legal infrastructure addressing the transnational trade of e-waste. It is the centerpiece of an international legal regime that has shaped or influenced many countries’ national legislation on e-waste. It provided the first comprehensive global environmental agreement on hazardous wastes and acknowledged e-waste as within the scope of environmental protection and cross-border trade. The general obligation proposed by the convention is that states exporting hazardous wastes must do so in an environmentally sound manner for the state of import and that they respect the policies of any country that prohibits imports as a whole. Currently, 176 states, including China, have ratified the convention. China signed the Basel Convention in 1990.The United States is the only developed country that has not ratified this treaty. Some US recycling plants have found that shipping their hazardous e-waste overseas for processing is much less expensive than handling it in the states where there are strict labor, environmental, and safety regulations. Members of the European Union can be penalized for shipping e-waste to developing countries, but they do manage to get away with it on some occasions. However, shipping e-waste to other countries is still legal in the U.S., so there are no consequences for companies that choose to do it.

The Convention does not impose a complete ban on the international transfer of hazardous waste. The transfer may be allowed under certain conditions, for example, if the state of export does not have the technical capacity and the necessary facilities, capacity or suitable disposal sites in order to dispose of the wastes in question in an environmentally sound and efficient manner. The definition of some of these key terms, “technical capacity,” “necessary facilities,” “environmentally sound and efficient manners,” and “wastes required as raw material” can be rather controversial in practice. Different countries may understand differently what can be counted as “necessary facilities” and what varieties of materials should be seen as “e-waste. Waste has been classified into two categories in the Basel Convention, namely, “hazardous wastes” and “other wastes” (wastes collected from households). The Basel Convention is only applicable to hazardous wastes. Many elements of e-waste are often categorized in the field under both entries: hazardous and other. The physical and chemical constitution of e-waste is very complex, and different elements are usually articulated or blended, making it highly labor-consuming to separate them. Consequently, wastes which have been categorized as “other wastes” are exempt from the regulation of transboundary movement, despite them being identified by the Convention as hazardous wastes.

At the global scale, trajectories of global e-waste flows are shaped by the multitude of loopholes, contradictions and ambiguous articles left by the Basel Convention and by different countries’ disparate attitudes towards the e-waste trade. Despite the longstanding international and national legislation regulating transnational trade and domestic recycling, informal e-waste economies are still clustering in many Global South countries. Moreover, a thorough ban on the international trade of e-waste can result in the loss of revenue for some industrial advocacy groups. Additionally, the focus of the Basel Convention is on the regulation of the body of countries, whereas illegal waste transfer is usually conducted by private firms or individuals.
