= Guiyu, Guangdong =

Town in China

Guiyu 贵屿镇
- Town
- Location within Guangdong
- Coordinates: 23°19′11.81″N 116°20′59.62″E
- Country: China
- Province: Guangdong
- Prefecture: Shantou
- Time zone: UTC+8 (China Standard Time)

Guiyu (Chinese: 贵屿; pinyin: Guìyǔ) is a town created from an agglomerate of four adjoined villages totalling 150,000 people in the Chaoyang district of Guangdong province in China. Situated on the South China Sea coast, Guiyu is perhaps best known in the global environmentalist community for its reception of e-waste. The town was once the largest e-waste recycling site in the world.

== Electronic waste ==
Guiyu was once the largest e-waste site on earth. The e-waste processed in Guiyu primarily came from the wealthy countries in the Global North. Regions like Guiyu rely on primitive electronics recycling as an economic staple despite the adverse effects electronic waste has on health and the environment. The burning off of plastics in the town has resulted in 80% of its children having dangerous levels of lead in their blood.

A 2008 of the area evaluated the extent of heavy metal contamination released from the site. Using dust samples, scientists analysed mean heavy metal concentrations in a Guiyu workshop and found that lead and copper were 371 and 115 times higher, respectively, compared to areas located 30 kilometres away. The same study revealed that sediment from the nearby Lianjiang River was found to be contaminated by polychlorinated biphenyls at a level three times greater than the amount prescribed in the guideline.

Since 2013, local authorities had moved most e-waste workshops into an experimental industrial ecology park called the National Circular Economy Pilot Industry Park. There, toxic waste by products can be treated and recycled with better efficiency. Air and water quality subsequently improved in the town, though many were still left contaminated from the remnants of e-waste processing and have not been cleaned up.

In 2015, authorities required e-waste processing to occur on the outskirts of town and increased efforts to reduce contamination elsewhere in the city. Informal e-waste recycling continued to occur in the city.

== Cultural influence ==
The Waste Tide, a novel by Chen Qiufan, envisions a science fiction version of Guiyu as the site of a utopian, proletarian revolution.

== See also ==
- Agbogbloshie (electronic waste site in Ghana)
- Dali Town, Foshan another E-waste processing town in China.
- Longtang Town, Qingcheng District, Qingyuan another E-waste processing town in China.
