= Frank Howarth =

Frank Howarth may refer to:

- Frank Howarth (public servant)
- Frank Howarth (woodworker)
