= Resta =

Resta is a surname. Notable people with the surname include:

- Anthony J. Resta, Canadian record producer and musician
- Dario Resta (1882–1924), Italian British race car driver

== See also ==
- DiResta (surname)
