= Australian Museum =

Public state museum in Sydney, Australia

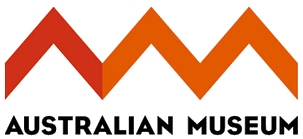

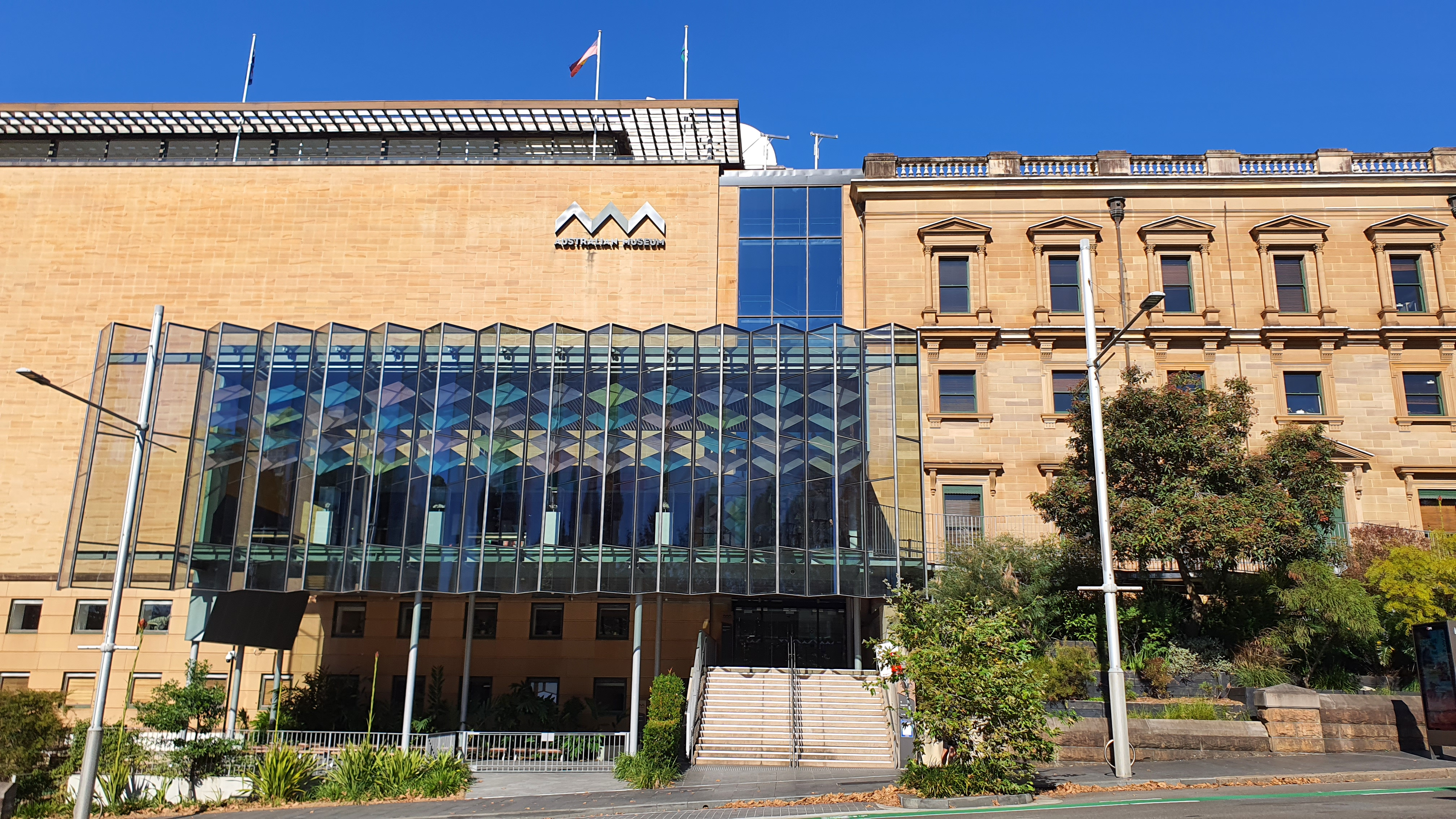
- The William Street exterior and Crystal Hall entry to the Australian Museum in 2016

- Location within Sydney central business district
- Former name: Colonial Museum; Sydney Museum
- Established: 1827; 199 years ago
- Location: 1 William Street, Darlinghurst, Sydney central business district, New South Wales, Australia (Map)
- Coordinates: 33°52′27″S 151°12′48″E
- Type: Natural history and anthropology
- Director: Kim McKay
- Public transit access: Museum (5 minute walk); William St near College St; William St before College St
- Website: australian.museum
- Building details

General information
- Architectural style: Greek Revival; International Style
- Construction started: 1846
- Completed: 1857

Technical details
- Material: Sydney sandstone

Design and construction
- Architects: Mortimer Lewis; James Barnet; Joseph van der Steen; Edward Farmer
- Architecture firm: New South Wales Colonial Architect

New South Wales Heritage Register
- Official name: Australian Museum
- Type: State heritage (built)
- Designated: 2 April 1999
- Reference no.: 805
- Type: Other – Education
- Category: Education

The Australian Museum, originally known as the Colonial Museum and Sydney Museum, is a state public museum in Sydney, New South Wales, Australia. It is operated and funded as a cultural institution by the state government of New South Wales.

With its predecessor originated in 1827, the museum is the oldest natural history museum in Australia and the fifth oldest natural history museum in the world. It was first conceived and developed along the contemporary European model of an encyclopedic warehouse of cultural and natural history, and features collections of vertebrate and invertebrate zoology, as well as mineralogy, palaeontology and anthropology. The scientific stature of the museum was established under the curatorship of scientist Gerard Krefft in the 1860s.

Apart from permanent displays in its galleries, permanent and temporary exhibitions, the museum also undertakes research and is involved in community programs. Since 1973 it has operated the Lizard Island Research Station on the Great Barrier Reef, studying the ecology of coral reefs and the effects of climate change. The Australian Museum Research Institute (AMRI), established in 2013, is the central hub for its researchers in Sydney. As of 2024 the CEO and executive director is Kim McKay, who was the first woman to be appointed to the position in 2014.

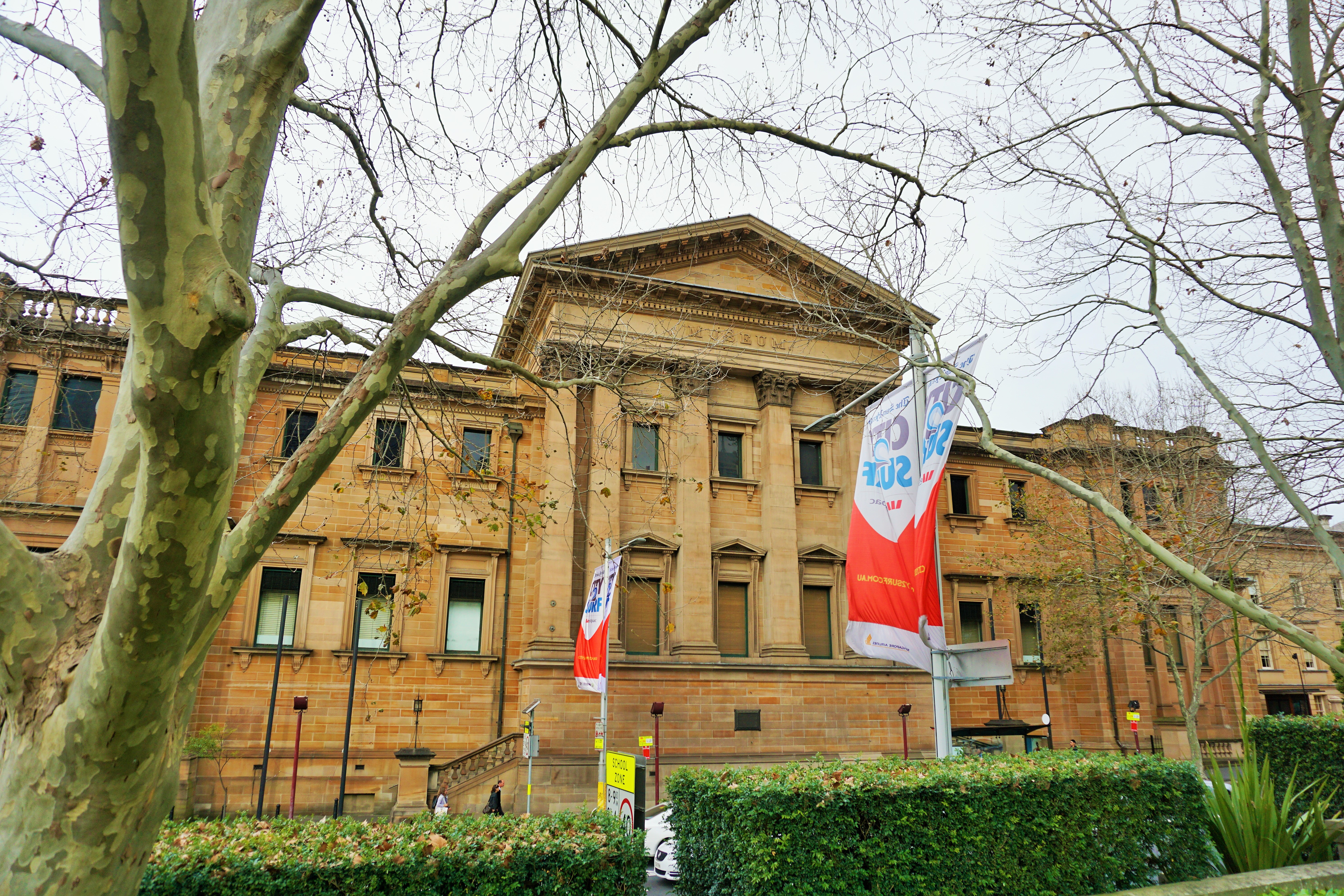
Main facade of the museum in College Street

== History ==
=== Establishment ===
The establishment of a museum had first been planned in 1821 by the Philosophical Society of Australasia, and although specimens were collected, the society folded in 1822. An entomologist and fellow of the Linnean Society of London, Alexander Macleay, arrived in 1826. After being appointed New South Wales Colonial Secretary, he began lobbying for a museum.

The museum was founded in 1827 by Earl Bathurst, then the Secretary of State for the Colonies, who wrote to the governor of New South Wales of his intention to found a public museum and who provided £200 yearly towards its upkeep. Its foundation in 1827 makes the museum the oldest natural history museum in the country, the fifth oldest in the world.

It was first conceived and developed along the contemporary European model of an encyclopedic warehouse of cultural and natural history, and features collections of vertebrate and invertebrate zoology, as well as mineralogy, palaeontology and anthropology. In the museum's early years, collecting was its main priority, and specimens were commonly traded with British and other European institutions.

In 1832 George Bennett, curator of the Australian Museum, explained the role of the museum:

"Here, in a public museum, the remains of the arts, etc., as existing among them, may be preserved as lasting memorials of the former races inhabiting the lands, when they have ceased to exist."

— George Bennett, Curator, 1835 – 1841.

The museum has grown to a collection of over 21 million cultural and scientific objects. The museum conducts taxonomic and systematic research. Its research station at Lizard Island conducts research on coral reef ecology. Through exhibitions and other public programs the Australian Museum continues to inform visitors about the flora, fauna and cultures of Australia and the Pacific.

=== Administration ===
The first custodian of the museum was William Holmes, appointed on 16 June 1829 and holding the position until 1835. In August 1831, Holmes accidentally shot himself while collecting specimens at Moreton Bay.

The museum was originally known as the Colonial Museum or Sydney Museum. It was administered directly by the colonial government until June 1836, until the establishment of a Committee of Superintendence of the Australian Museum and Botanical Garden. Sub-committees were established for each institution. Members of these committees were generally the leading members of the political and scientific classes of Sydney; and scions of the Macleay served until 1853, at which point the committee was abolished. In that year, the government enacted the Australian Museum Act 1853 (17 Vic. Act No. 2), thereby incorporating it and establishing a board of trustees consisting of 24 members. William Sharp Macleay, the former committee chairman, continued to serve as the chairman of this committee. The museum was renamed in June 1836 by a sub-committee meeting, when it was resolved during an argument that it should be renamed the "Australian Museum".

The scientific stature of the museum was established under the curatorship of Gerard Krefft (1861–1874), himself a published scientist.

=== 20th century ===
After a run of field collecting activities by the scientific staff in the 1880s and 1890s, field work ceased until after the First World War. In the 1920s, new expeditions were launched to New Guinea, the Kermadec Islands and Santa Cruz in the Solomon Islands, as well as to many parts of Australia, including the Capricorn Islands off the coast of Queensland.

During the 19th century, galleries had mainly included large display cases overly filled with specimens and artefacts. During the 1920s, museum displays grew to include dioramas showing habitat groups, but otherwise the Museum was largely unchanged during the period beginning with the curatorship of Robert Etheridge Jr (1895–1919), until the appointment of John Evans in 1954, when under his direction, additional buildings were built, several galleries were overhauled, and a new Exhibitions department was created. The size of the education staff was also radically increased. By the end of the 1950s, all of the galleries had been completely overhauled.

The museum's growth in the field of scientific research continued with a new department of environmental studies, created in 1968 by director Frank Talbot. Research on the Great Barrier Reef began in 1965, with the One Tree Island Research Station established at the southern end (now operated by the University of Sydney). (around 1965 The museum support society, The Australian Museum Society (TAMS), now known as Australian Museum Members) was formed in 1972, and in 1973 the Lizard Island Research Station (LIRS), was established near Cairns, both under the leadership of Talbot.

The Australian Museum Train, an early outreach project, was officially launched on 8 March 1978. The train was described as "a wonderful new concept of the travelling circus! The only difference is that the travelling Museum Train will bring school children and the people of NSW into contact with the wonders of nature, evolution and Wildlife." The two-carriage train was renovated and refurbished at Eveleigh Carriage Workshops, and fitted out with exhibits by the Australian Museum at a cost of about $100,000. One carriage displayed the evolution of the earth, animals and man. The second carriage was a lecture and visual display area. The train ceased operations in December 1988 but the museum's outreach work in regional communities continues.

In 1991, the museum established a commercial consulting and project management group, the Australian Museum Business Services (AMBS), now known as Australian Museum Consulting. In 1995, the museum established new research centres in conservation, biodiversity, evolutionary research, geodiversity and "People and Places". These research centres have now been incorporated into the museum's natural science collection programs. In 1998, the djamu gallery opened at Customs House, Circular Quay, the first major new venue for the museum beyond College Street site. A series of exhibitions on Indigenous culture were displayed until the gallery closed at the end of 2000.

=== 21st century ===
In 2001, two rural associate museums were established, The Age of Fishes Museum in Canowindra and the Australian Fossil and Mineral Museum in Bathurst which includes the mineral and dinosaur Somerville Collection donated by Warren Somerville.

In 2002, ICAC launched Operation Savoy to investigate thefts of the zoological collections by a museum employee.

In 2011, the museum launched its first Mobile App – "DangerOZ" – about Australia's most dangerous animals.

In 2014, Kim McKay was appointed the CEO and executive director, a position she still holds as of 2024. She is the first woman to hold the position

In 2017, museum researchers reassigned a Tasmanian species of semi-slug from the genus Helicarion to Attenborougharion, named after the museum's Lifetime Patron David Attenborough, hence known as Attenborougharion rubicundus.

In December 2023, the Museum became the subject of criticism for its decision to reword an exhibition panel by World Heritage Exhibitions replacing its word "Palestine" with "what is today known as Libya and Palestine", after the Australian Jewish Association had accused the museum of "inaccurate use of the word 'Palestine' in an exhibit on Ancient Egypt". The Australian Palestine Advocacy Network and the Australian Friends of Palestine Association issued strong criticism of "the ideological expunging of cultural identity from history". On 3 January 2024, the World Heritage Exhibitions announced that it had no plans to change the text, as there was no intention "to convey any political assertions".

== Building ==
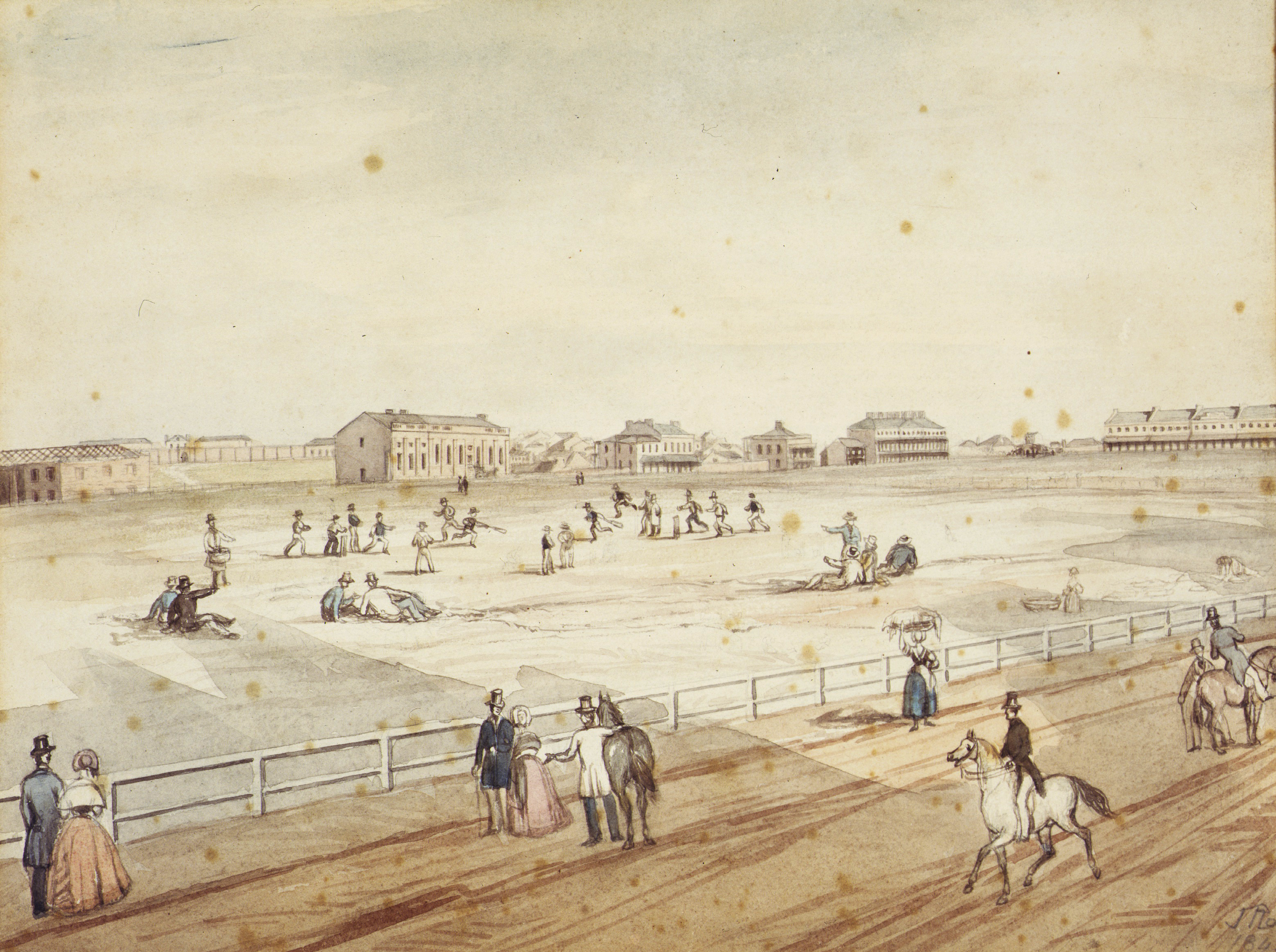
Hyde Park, with the museum under construction in the distance, by John Rae

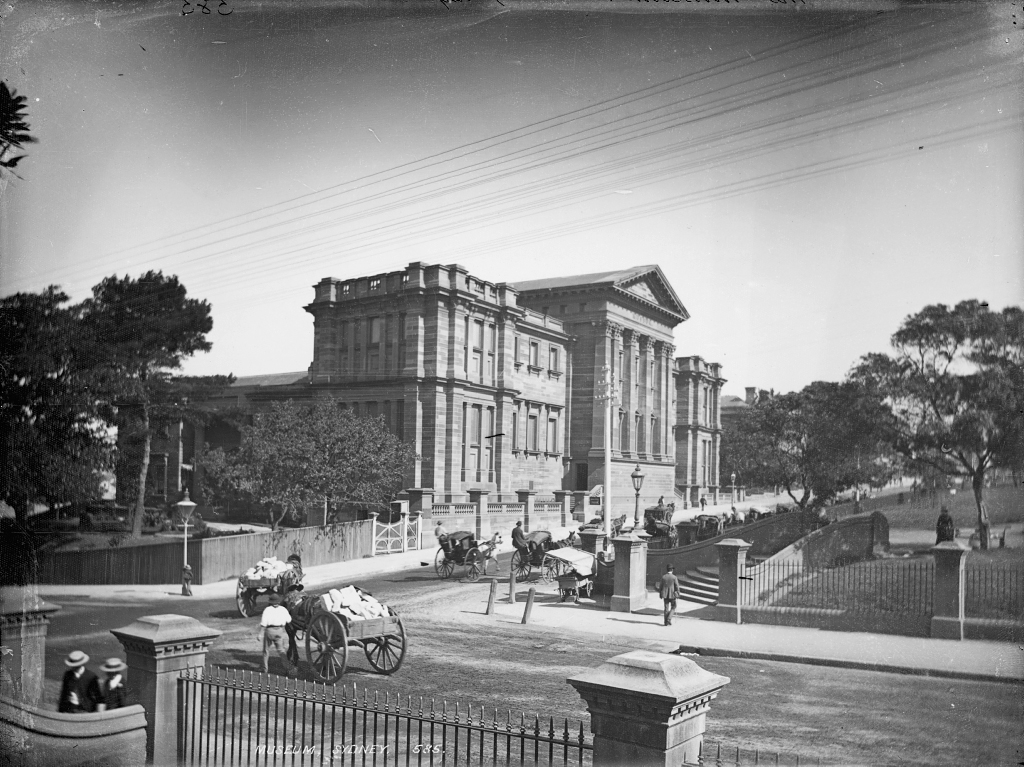
Barnet Wing c. 1870

=== Move to current site ===
The first location of the museum in 1827 was probably a room in the offices of the Colonial Secretary, although over the following thirty years it had several other locations in Sydney, until it moved into its current home in 1849. Its location is at the corner of William Street and College Street in the Sydney central business district, in the City of Sydney LGA.

The heritage-listed building has evolved to encompass a range of different architectural styles and when its building expanded, it was often in conjunction with an expansion of the collections.

The Long Gallery is part of the wing designed by New South Wales Colonial Architect Mortimer Lewis, and the earliest building on the site, c. 1846. This is a handsome building of Sydney sandstone in the Greek Revival style on the corner of College and William Streets, opposite Hyde Park, designed by the Colonial Architect James Barnet, and it was first opened to the public in May 1857.

In order to accommodate the expanding collections of the museum, Barnet was responsible for the construction of the neoclassical west wing along William Street in 1868. A third storey was added to the north Lewis wing in 1890, bringing cohesion to the building design.

=== 20th century ===
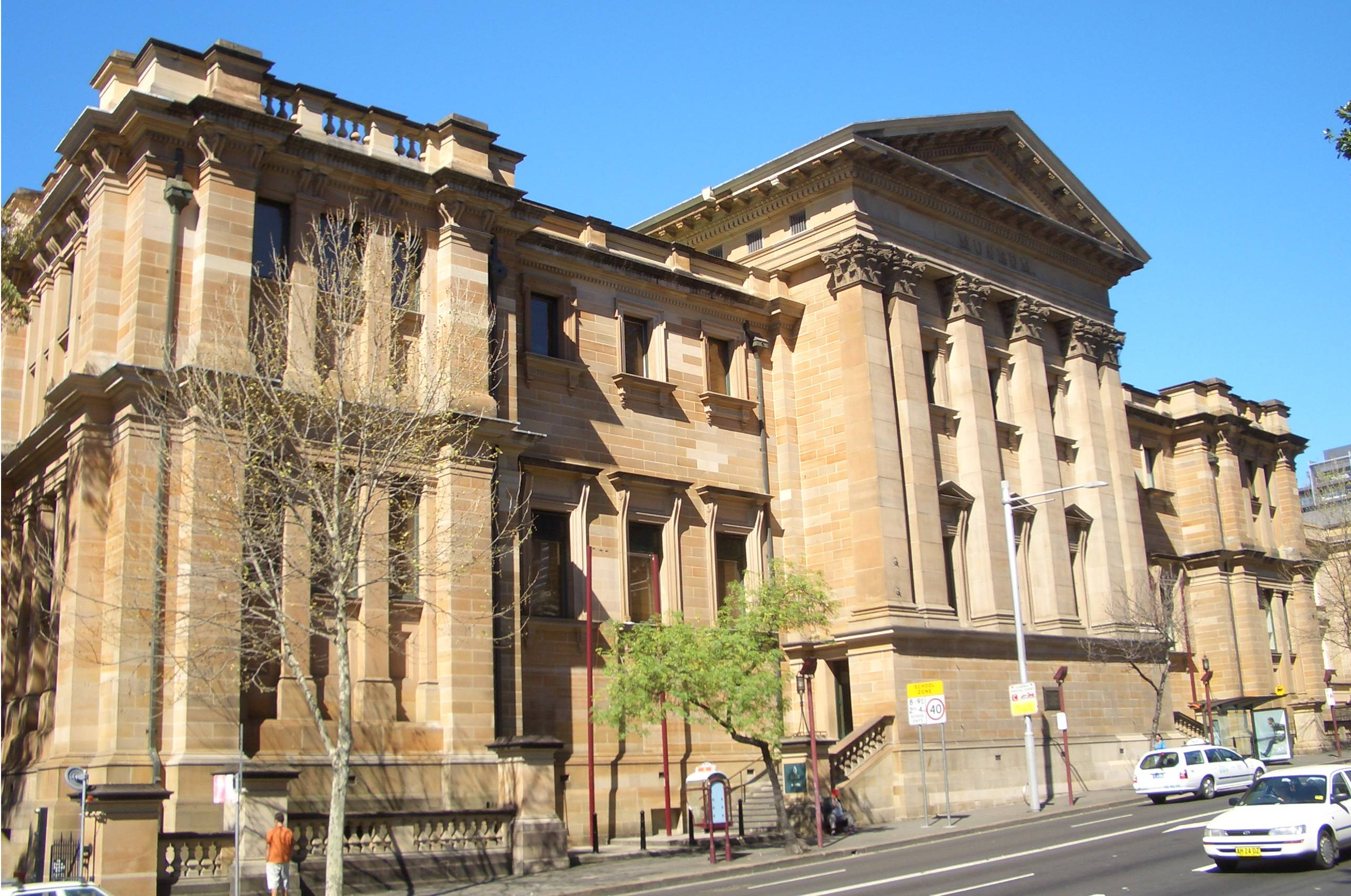
The Barnet Wing

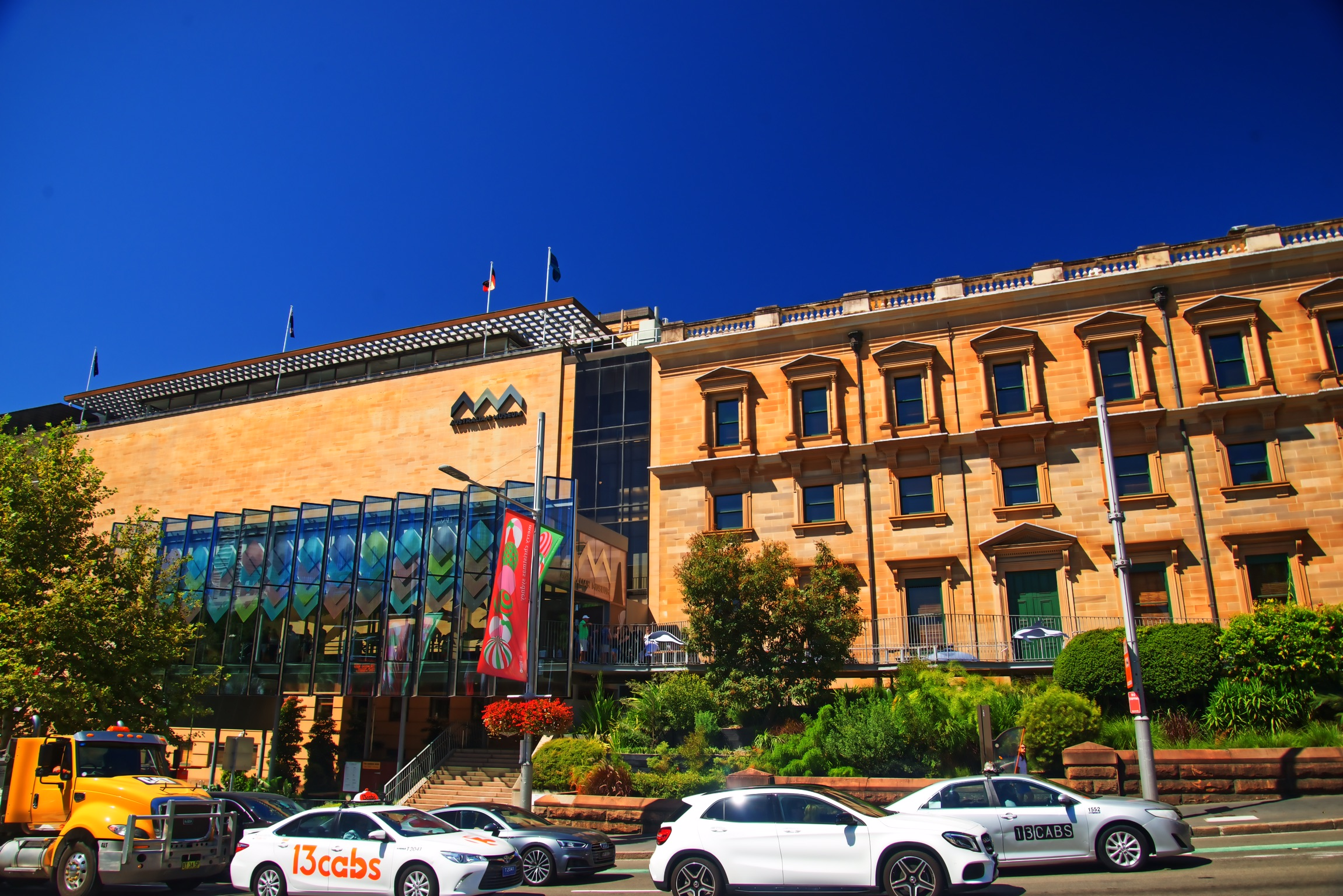
The Australian Museum along William Street

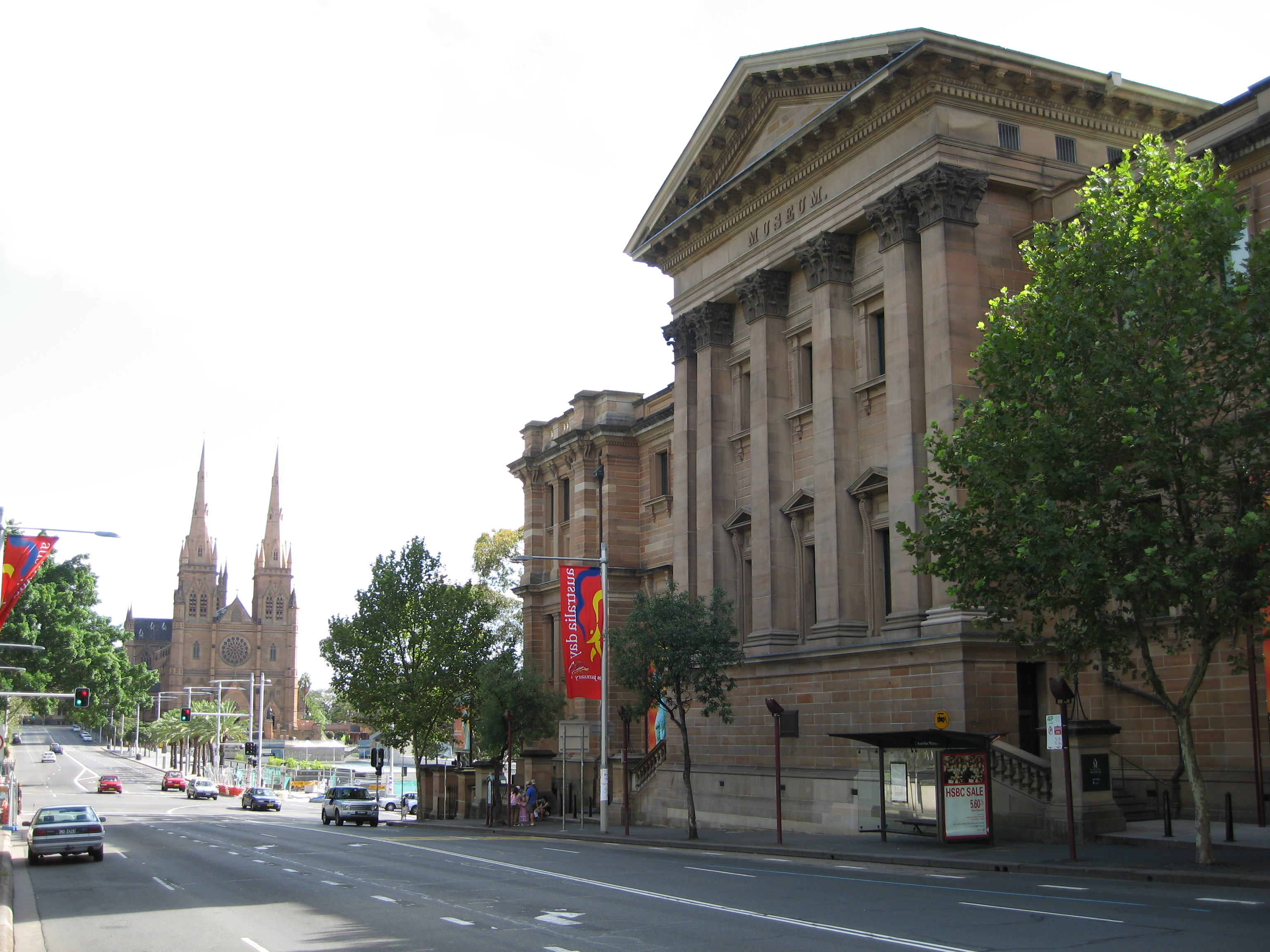
The Australian Museum, College Street

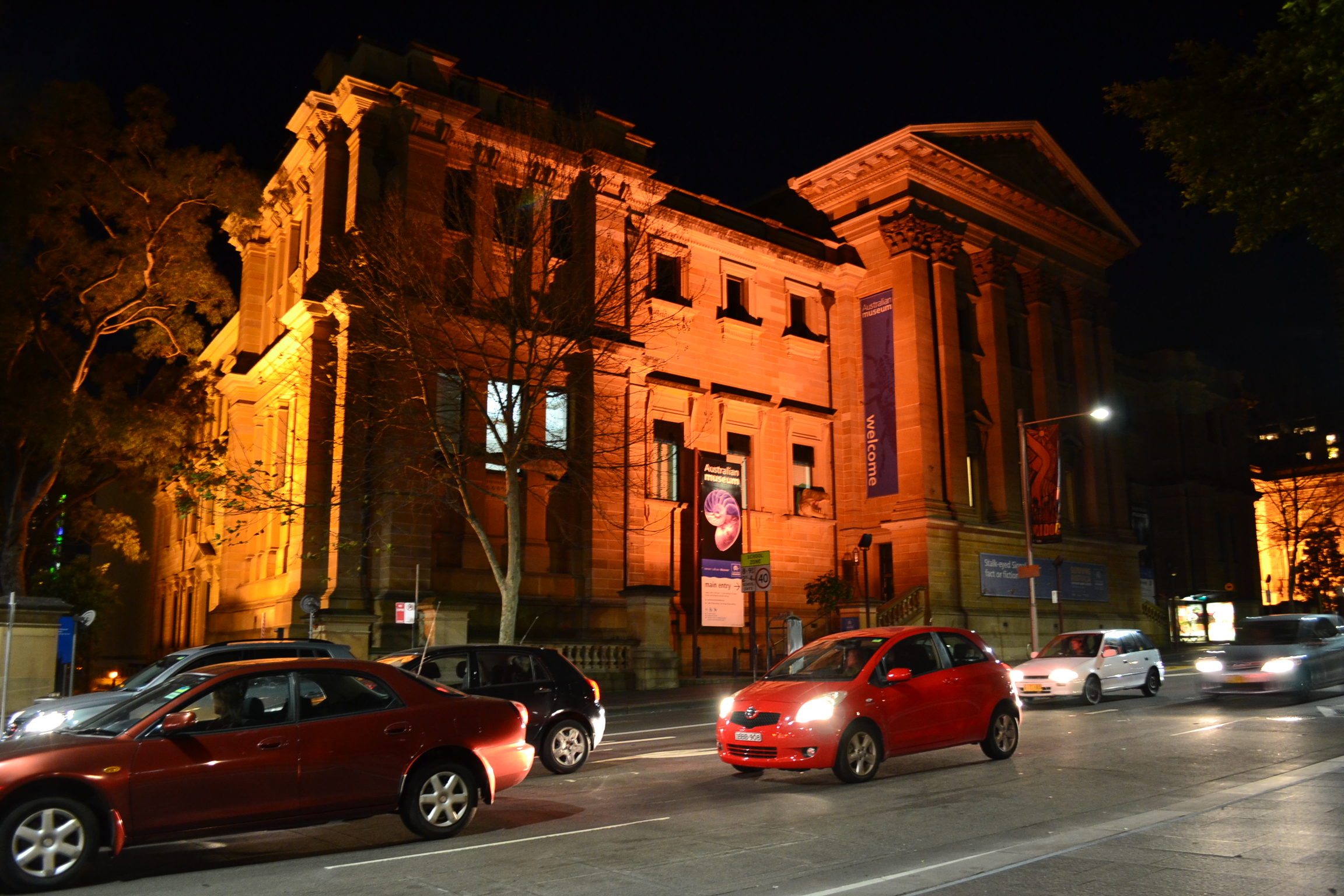
Museum at night

In 1963, the floor space of the museum almost doubled when Joseph van der Steen under the Government Architect, Edward Farmer, designed a six-story extension linked to the Lewis building for the scientific and research collections, the reference library and a public restaurant. There were also two basement floors providing workspace for scientific staff. This International Style extension became known as the Parkes/Farmer eastern wing. In 1977, to mark the Museum's 150th anniversary, bronze lower case letters were added to the façade identifying the building as "The Australian Museum".

=== 21st century ===
In 2008, a significant expansion took place on the College Street site with the addition of the new Collection and Research building which added 5000 square metres of office, laboratory and storage areas for scientists.

In 2015, the museum's carbon-neutral glass box entryway known as the "Crystal Hall" was opened. Designed by Neeson-Murcutt, it returned the entry to William Street and provided access via a suspended walkway. In December 2016, the Museum made public a $285 million master plan proposing to greatly expand its available exhibition space, by adding a 13-storey building on the block's east, adding a large central glazed atrium space.

At the end of 2020, after being closed for 15 months, the 200-year-old museum reopened following a major $57.5 million upgrade. Subsequent to its refurbishment, museum entry is free for the public. The expansion included the new Hintze Hall, shop, café, members lounge, and education rooms, along with an expanded exhibition area for temporary exhibitions.

=== Heritage listing ===
Australian Museum building and its collection was added to the New South Wales State Heritage Register on 2 April 1999.

The Australian Museum buildings house the first public museum inaugurated in Australia, one of Australia's oldest scientific and cultural institutions. Conceived and developed initially along the contemporary European model of an encyclopedic warehouse of cultural and natural history, the museum buildings evolved as the institution evolved, partly in response to its visiting public, to pursue and expand knowledge of the natural history of Australia and the nearby pacific region. The museum continues to occupy the site provided, and the building constructed, as its first permanent home, commenced in 1846 and opened to the public in 1857. The extended and enlarged complex of buildings which now provide its principal exhibition, administrative and research accommodation reflect the growth of the institution and its prestige, as well as the evolving attitudes of Australian Government and society to science and research.

The Museum's various buildings further comprise a unique aggregation of work by successive colonial and Government Architects of New South Wales, exhibiting:

- changes in the philosophy and functional requirements of museum design
- changing stylistic influences and design approaches in architecture from the early 19th century to the present
- corresponding developments in building technology, materials and craftsmanship

Individually the various elements of the Museum complex remain significantly intact, with potential for enhancement of their cultural significance through conservation techniques, though conflicts exist between conservation of fabric and contemporary use, particularly exhibition techniques. Of special note are the exteriors and principal interiors of the three earliest wings of the complex, which despite varying degrees of alteration, remain in substantial original condition. The interlinked exhibition galleries comprise an important group of 19th and early 20th century public interests.

Through its development, the Museum complex has assumed a prominent stature in the townscape of Sydney. With its frontage to William and College Street, the Museum commands the eastern reaches of Hyde Park and forms and extension of the principal historic civic and religious precincts adjoining the northern boundaries of the park in Macquarie and College streets. Through recent expansion the museum site includes the former grounds and two surviving buildings of the William Street National School, which, established in 1851, is one of the earlier public schools continued in educational use for almost 100 years.

== Research ==
The museum is also involved in Indigenous studies research and community programs.

=== Lizard Island Research Station ===
The Lizard Island Research Station was established in 1973 on Lizard Island, in the Great Barrier Reef. It continues to be operated by the Australian Museum.

=== Australian Museum Research Institute ===
In September 2013, the Australian Museum Research Institute (AMRI) was launched at the museum.

AMRI's purposes are:

- to provide a focal point for the many researchers working in the museum
- to facilitate collaborations with government research agencies, universities, gardens, zoos and other museums
- to showcase the important scientific research that is being done at the museum, focusing on climate change impacts on biodiversity; the detection and biology of pest species; understanding what constitutes and influences effective biodiversity conservation

It also forms and publishes a science strategy to guide science at the museum.

AMRI's staff, numbering around 100, includes research scientists, collection scientists, collection officers. There are also over 130 AMRI associates, fellows, and students, and the institute hosts visiting local and international researchers regularly.

=== Journals ===
The museum also publishes two peer-reviewed academic journals:

- Records of the Australian Museum
- Technical Reports of the Australian Museum Online

== Public programs and initiatives ==
The museum is also involved in community programs.

=== FrogID ===
In 2017, the museum began a citizen science project called FrogID to help conserve and document the distribution of frog populations throughout Australia. Each year, participants are encouraged to record frog sounds on the FrogID app. The aggregated data are then analysed to provide a snapshot of the health of frog populations across Australia.

In 2022, the museum's FrogID project collaborated with the Bowerbird Collective, Listening Earth, and Mervyn Street of Mangkaja Arts, to produce the album Australian Frog Calls. The album is a compilation of frog sounds from both biologist recordings and public submissions, including recordings dating back to the 1970s from FrogID's database. The album was released on 2 December 2022, debuted at number 3 on the ARIA Charts, and was nominated for ARIA Award for Best World Music Album at the 2023 ARIA Music Awards.

=== DigiVol ===
The Australian Museum launched DigiVol in 2011 in partnership with the Atlas of Living Australia as an online citizen science platform for digitising museum and research collections. Volunteers transcribe information from specimen labels, field notebooks and other collection records through web-based projects, and the platform is now used by museums and research institutions in Australia and internationally.

=== Nights at the Museum ===
The Australian Museum's "Night at the Museum" series, funded by the NSW Government, are sessions held on a weeknight evening at various times of the year. Guests and friends can explore the museum between 5pm and 9pm, free of charge. As part of this, there are also special events held at the museum, including The Talbot Oration and Ngalu Warrawi Marri (We Stand Strong), an evening of live music, talks, workshops, and performances celebrating First Nations peoples of Australia. Originally held on Thursday nights, in 2023 the nights were changed to Wednesdays.

=== Talbot Oration ===
The annual Talbot Oration was founded in honour of former director Frank Talbot in 2021, and is held in June each year. It celebrates his achievements in and commitment to marine research and environmental studies, and the oration is intended "to showcase advances in the field of climate change research and environmental conservation, enabling the public to better understand how responses to the climate challenge determine our future prospects, health, and the sustainability of our natural environment". International Conservation Services is a supporting partner of the event.

The inaugural Talbot Oration took place on 3 June 2021, and was given by scientist, author, and conservationist Tim Flannery, whose address was titled "The Climate Cure", reflecting the title of his new book. Subsequent orations have been given by:

- 2022: Anne Hoggett, co-director of the museum's Lizard Island Research Station, titled "Coral Reefs in Hot Water"
- 2023: Rebecca Huntley, author and social researcher, titled "Inspiring Visions for a Climate Solution"
- 2024: Cynthia Houniuhi, president of Pacific Islands Students Fighting Climate Change, who have taken their case to the International Court of Justice, titled "Taking Climate to the World’s Highest Court"; joined by a discussion panel afterwards including Craig Reucassel and Richie Merzian, moderated by Narelda Jacobs

== Permanent galleries ==
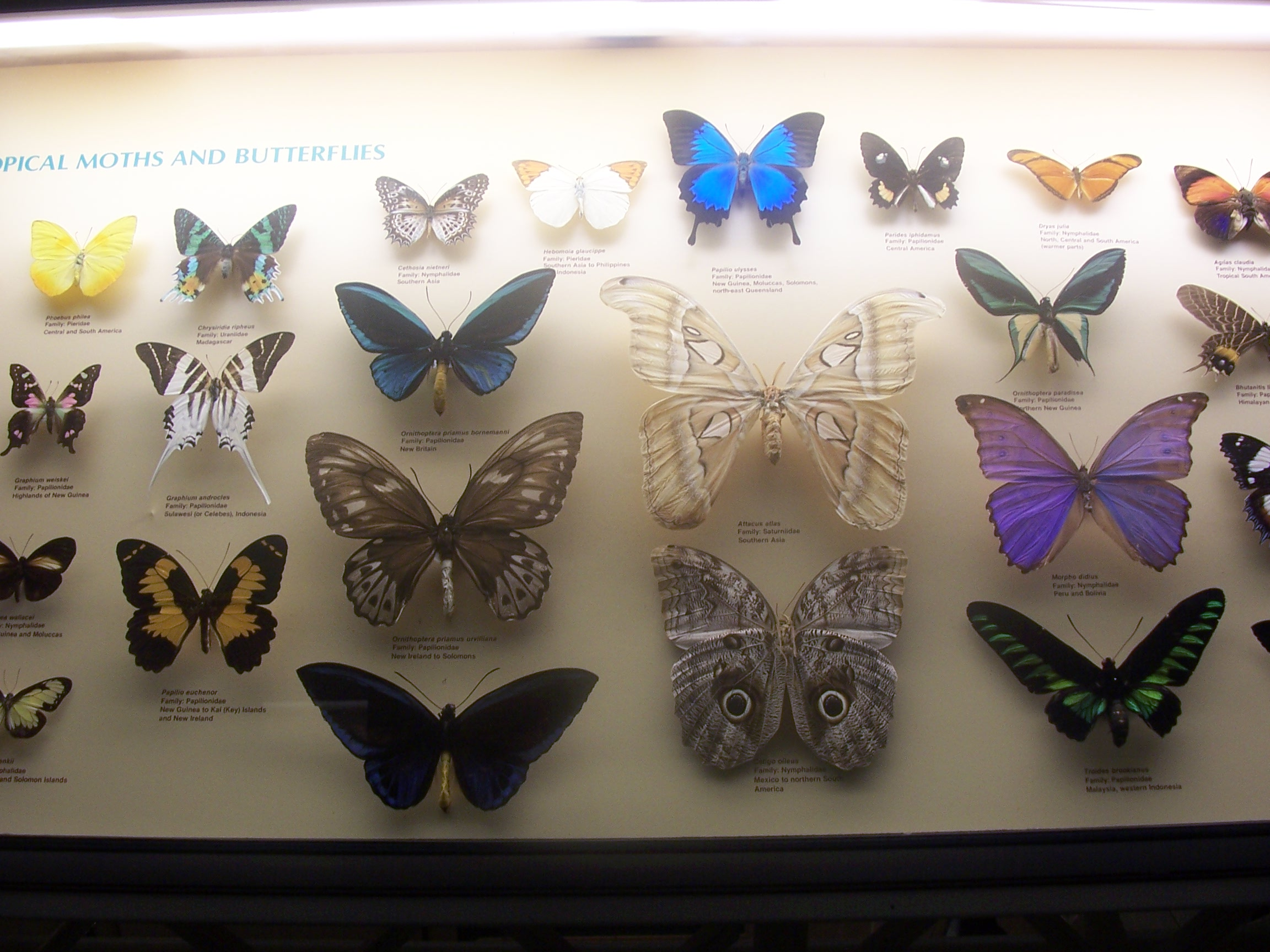
Butterflies

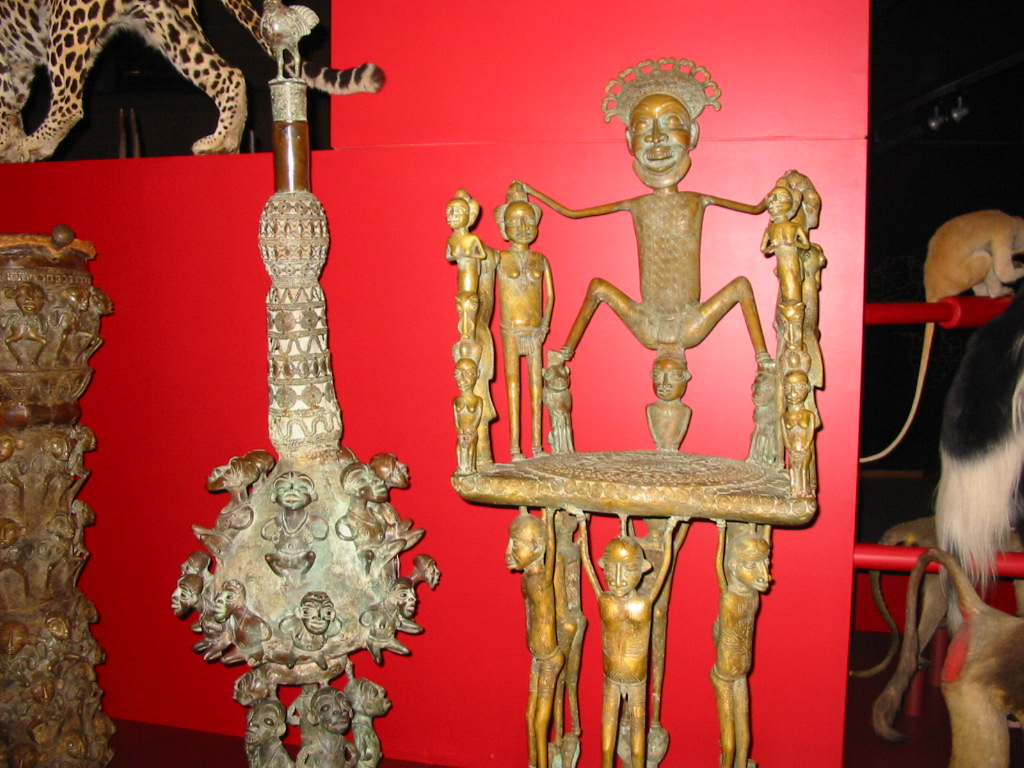
African metalwork art (2007)

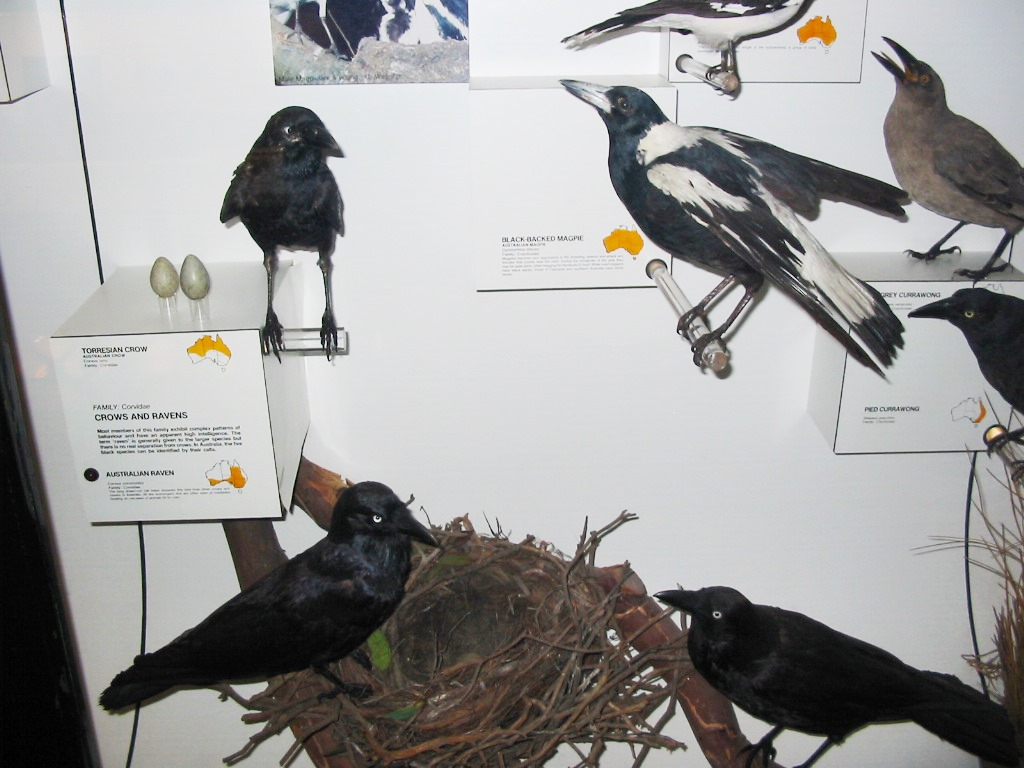
Australian bird specimens (2007)

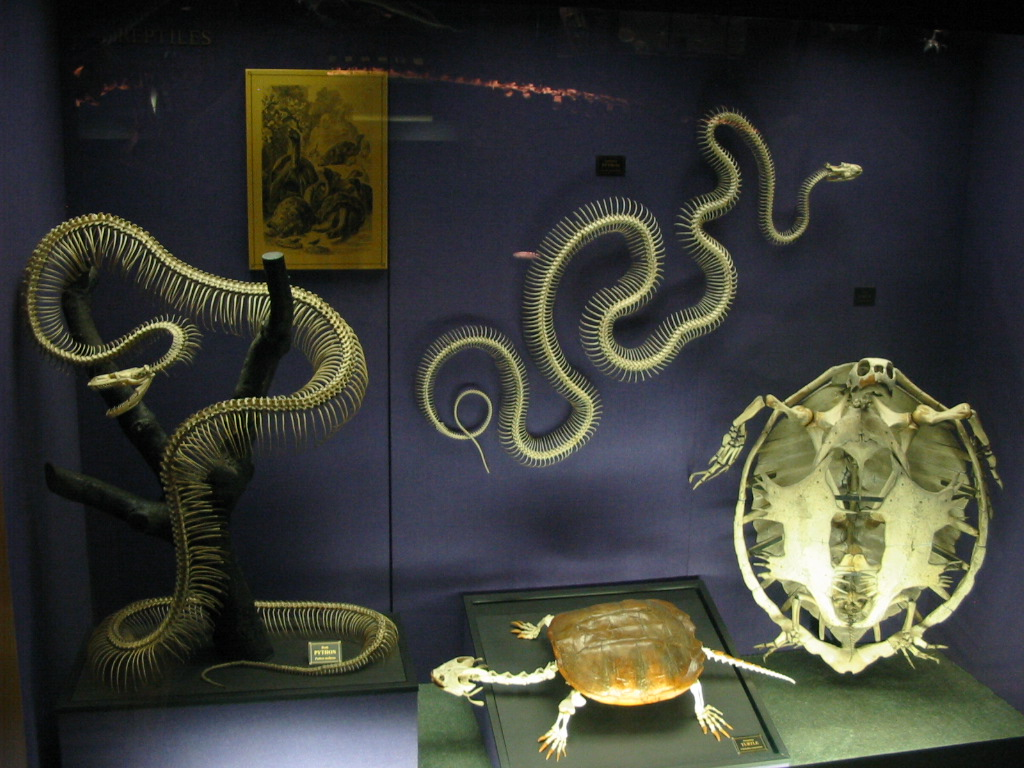
Skeletal structure of snakes and other reptiles (2007)

The permanent galleries accommodate a large number of display cases containing a variety of animal species, including butterflies, birds, and reptiles, as well as cultural artefacts and art.

In 2008, two permanent galleries were opened, "Dinosaurs" and "Surviving Australia".

In 2014, the permanent exhibition "Garrigarrang: Sea Country" was opened, displaying objects relating to Aboriginal and Torres Strait Islander peoples.

When the Crystal Hall was opened as the museum's new entrance in August 2015, the former foyer, the Barnet Wing, became the permanent gallery housing "Wild Planet" – a display of over 400 animals that explores and explains evolution and the tree of life.

Jurassic Lounge was established in early 2011 by the Australian Museum and non-profit company The Festivalists, a seasonal display event of contemporary art. Combining events, live music, art, cultural displays, and new media with standard exhibition space in the museum precinct, Jurassic Lounge is a seasonal display-event held on Tuesdays for two seasons annually. Jurassic lounge opened on 1 February 2011. It is held after-hours at the Australian Museum. It allows the public to discover Sydney's newest artists, musicians and performers. 2018's event included a burlesque show, a silent disco, live painting, a photobooth, interaction with museum animals (snake and stick insects).

In 2022, the permanent minerals gallery was opened.

== Exhibitions ==
The museum has hosted various exhibitions since 1854 to the present day, including permanent, temporary, and touring exhibitions, such as "Dinosaurs from China", "Festival of the Dreaming", "Beauty from Nature: Art of the Scott Sisters" and "Wildlife Photographer of the Year".

Some exhibitions were directly curated by the museum and have exhibited internationally, include "Sharks" and "Tyrannosaurs: Meet the Family".

=== Permanent ===
In 2017, the permanent exhibition "200 Treasures of the Australian Museum" was reopened as part of the "Westpac Long Gallery", being Australia's first museum gallery, which was previously called the "Long Gallery". Some of the objects on display include the wooden sled used during Sir Douglas Mawson's expedition to Antarctica, an Egyptian mummy, and a feathered cape given to Captain James Cook on his arrival to Hawaii. The expanded gallery also contains the Birds of Australia gallery.

In late 2023, "Wansolmoana" (lit. 'One Salt Ocean'), a permanent exhibition of hundreds of Pacific cultural objects opened. This replaced the interim "Pacific Spirit" gallery, which opened in 2015 and was stated to be one of the world's biggest collections of Pacific artwork at the time.

=== Temporary ===
In 2012, an exhibition called Sydney Elders was opened. It consisted of photographs by renowned Aboriginal photographer Mervyn Bishop of a selection of local Elders who have "contributed to the important role of culture, education, health, community or social justice". The collection is accompanied by an essay written by Djon Mundine, entitled "Growing Old on Eora Country". Elders whose portraits were included in the collection include Christine Donnelly, founder of the Aboriginal Dance Theatre Redfern; Naomi Mayers, founder of the Aboriginal Health Service; Sol Bellear, member and leader of many Aboriginal organizations; and singer-songwriter Vic Simms; and activists and leaders Dulcie Flower, Paul Coe, and Lyall Munro Jnr.

In 2012–13, the museum hosted "Alexander the Great: 2000 Years of Treasures" which exhibited a collection of artefacts from the Hermitage Museum in Saint Petersburg, Russia.

In 2014–15, the museum hosted "Aztecs", a collection of 200 artefacts from around 20 Mexican museums, being the first time an Aztec-themed exhibition was displayed in the Southern Hemisphere.

In 2015, "Trailblazers: Australia's 50 Greatest Explorers" opened, honoring the work of Bourke and Wills, Nancy Bird Walton, Dick Smith, Jessica Watson and Tim Jarvis, among others.

In 2021, "Unsettled", a temporary exhibition on the colonisation of Australia through Indigenous perspectives, ran from 22 May until 10 October. Including over 80 significant cultural artefacts as well as more than 100 contributions by Aboriginal and Torres Strait Islander people across Australia, the exhibition was curated by Laura McBride and Mariko Smith.

The museum was due to hold "Tutankhamun: The Treasures of the Golden Pharaoh" in 2021, however this was cancelled due to the COVID-19 pandemic. However, in late 2023, the museum was the fourth in the world to open "Ramses & the Gold of the Pharaohs". It was announced that Ramses' coffin would also be loaned to the Australian Museum, with Sydney being the second city in the world outside of Egypt to display the artefact.

In 2026, Bloodsuckers: Legends to Leeches opened to the public. Created by the Royal Ontario Museum in Canada, this exhibit has live animals including vampire bats, leeches, sea lampreys, mosquitoes, ticks, fleas, medicinal leeches, and others, as well as bust of Dracula, a bust of Nosferatu, a Tick action figure, a copy of Bram Stoker's Dracula, a sculpture of the dog-like Chupacabra, and many other specimens and artifacts.

== Recognition ==
The Australian Museum has an international reputation in the fields of natural history and anthropology.

== Governance and funding ==
The Australian Museum is a New South Wales Government organisation, under the Department of Creative Industries, Tourism, Hospitality and Sport. It is a statutory body, established under the Australian Museum Trust Act 1975, and governed by a board of trustees. It is a not-for-profit organisation, with most of its funding coming from the state government.

The director and CEO, as of November 2024 Kim McKay, oversees the day-to-day running of the museum and determines its strategic direction.

=== Australian Museum Trust ===
The Australian Museum Trust (AM Trust), trading as the Australian Museum, is a not-for-profit organisation, with most of its funding coming from the state government.

In 1986, Joyce Clague became the first Aboriginal person to become a trustee.

Since January 2023 and as of November 2024, Brian Hartzer is president of the AM Trust, after being appointed a trustee in January 2021. Other trustees include academic and writer Larissa Behrendt and former deputy premier Carmel Tebbutt.

The inaugural president was former Colonial Secretary of New South Wales, Alexander Macleay,(1836–1848), and other past presidents include Catherine Livingstone, Sam Mostyn, Robyn Williams, Wallace Charles Wurth, and Gustavus Athol Waterhouse.

=== Australian Museum Foundation ===
The Australian Museum Foundation was established in the mid-2000s by Brian Sherman, a former president of the AM Trust (2001–2009), to enlarge the group of donors involved in the museum's work. The AMF is a not-for-profit organisation that exists solely to raise funds to support all types of projects across the museum.

Brian Hartzer was chair of the AM Foundation from December 2020 until December 2022. In February 2023, David Feetham was appointed director and chair.

=== Past curators and directors ===
The position of "curator" was renamed "director and curator" in 1918 and from, 1921 "director". In 1948, the "scientific assistants" (the scientific staff) were redesignated "curators" and "assistant curators". In 1983, during a period of reorganisation, the position of curator was renamed as "collection manager".

Order	Officeholder	Position title	Start date	End date	Term in office	Notes
1	William Holmes	Custodian	16 June 1829	1835	5–6 years	
2	George Bennett	Curator	1835	1841	5–6 years	First leader to catalogue the museum's collections
3	The Revd W. B. Clarke	Curator	1841	1843	1–2 years	
4	William Sheridan Wall	Curator	1845	1858	12–13 years	Long-time collector to the museum; wrote and illustrated History and Description of a New Sperm Whale (1851)
6	Simon Rood Pittard	Curator	1861	1861	1–2 years	
7	Gerard Krefft	Curator	1861	1874	12–13 years	
8	Edward Pierson Ramsay	Curator	1874	1894	19–20 years	Greatly increased the recruitment of scientific staff; in 1890 started the Records of the Australian Museum, a publication which continues to the present
9	Robert Etheridge, Junior	Director and Curator	1895	1919	23–24 years	
10	Charles Anderson	Director	1921	1940	18–19 years	
11	Arthur Bache Walkom	Director	1941	1954	12–13 years	
12	John William Evans	Director	1954	1966	11–12 years	
13	Frank Talbot	Director	1966	1975	8–9 years	Doubled staff number to 150; established Dept of Environmental Studies; started research on the Great Barrier Reef and established Lizard Island Research Station.
14	Desmond Griffin	Director	1976	1998	21–22 years	
15	Michael Archer	Director	1999	2004	4–5 years	
16	Frank Howarth	Director	2004	2014	9–10 years	
17	Kim McKay	CEO & executive director	2014	present	11–12 years	The first woman to hold the position

== See also ==
- "The New Museum Idea"
- The Lewis Collection
- List of museums in Australia
- List of Natural History articles by Gerard Krefft in The Sydney Mail
- National Museum of Australia
- Museum of Sydney
