= Dirty Money =

Dirty Money may refer to:

== Film ==
- Dirty Money (1972 film), a 1972 Canadian film
- Un flic, a 1972 French film also known as Dirty Money
- The Great Riviera Bank Robbery a.k.a. Dirty Money, a 1979 UK film

== Music ==
- Diddy – Dirty Money, hip-hop group created by Sean "Diddy" Combs
- Dirty Money (album), by UGK
- "Dirty Money", a song by Clipse from their album Hell Hath No Fury
- "Dirty Money", a song by Brooke Candy from her album Candyland

== Television series ==
- Dirty Money (2011 TV series), 2011 American reality television show
- Dirty Money (2018 TV series), 2018 American documentary series
- Dirty Money (game show), 2002 UK game show
- Dirty Money: The Story of the Criminal Assets Bureau, 2008 Irish crime series

== See also ==
- Black money (disambiguation)
- Clean money (disambiguation)
- Counterfeit money
- Money laundering
- Dirty Sexy Money, 2007 American drama series
