= Dark Money (disambiguation) =

Dark money is a form of political donation in which donors are not disclosed.

Dark Money may also refer to:

- Dark Money (book), a 2016 non-fiction book by Jane Mayer
- Dark Money (film), a 2018 documentary by Kimberly Reed
- Dark Money (TV series), a 2019 British miniseries about a child star who is sexually assaulted by a film producer while his parents are bribed to keep their silence

== See also ==
- Black money (disambiguation)
