= List of Natural History articles by Gerard Krefft in The Sydney Mail =

Johann Ludwig (Louis) Gerard Krefft (1830 – 1881), one of Australia's first and most influential zoologists and palaeontologists, was an artist, draughtsman, scientist, and natural historian, who served as the curator of the Australian Museum, in Sydney, New South Wales, for 13 years (1861–1874). The following is a list of Krefft's articles that were regularly published in the "Natural History" Section of The Sydney Mail between 4 March 1871 and 26 June 1875. Although a small number of relevant items written by others appeared in The Sydney Mail's "Natural History" section from time to time — e.g., John William Brazier (2 March 1872), George Bennett (9 August 1873), Georgen Mivart (7 March 1874), "Anonymous" (16 May 1874), etc. — the section's very first article was Krefft's 4 March 1871 contribution, and its very last was Krefft's 26 June 1875 contribution:

- Krefft, G., "Natural History: The Natural History of New South Wales", The Sydney Mail, (4 March 1871), p. 22.
- Krefft, G., "Natural History: The Natural History of New South Wales", The Sydney Mail, (11 March 1871), p. 57.
- Krefft, G., "Natural History: The Natural History of New South Wales", The Sydney Mail, (18 March 1871), p. 89.
- Krefft, G., "Natural History: The Natural History of New South Wales", The Sydney Mail, (25 March 1871), p. 122.
- Krefft, G., "Natural History: The Natural History of New South Wales", The Sydney Mail, (1 April 1871), p. 154.
- Krefft, G., "Natural History: The Natural History of New South Wales: Class Myriapoda", The Sydney Mail, (8 April 1871), pp. 185—186.
- Krefft, G., "Natural History: The Natural History of New South Wales: Class Arachnida—Spiders and Spider-like Animals"], The Sydney Mail, (15 April 1871), pp. 217—218.
- Krefft, G., "Natural History: The Natural History of New South Wales: Section I—Tetrapneumanes", The Sydney Mail, (22 April 1871), p. 249.
- Krefft, G., "Natural History: The Natural History of New South Wales", The Sydney Mail, (29 April 1871), pp. 281—282.
- Krefft, G., "Natural History: Fossil Men and Fossil Animals in Europe and Australia", The Sydney Mail, (6 May 1871), pp. 313—314.
- Krefft, G., "Natural History: Australian Fossil Animals; A Short History of their Discovery", The Sydney Mail, (13 May 1871), p. 345.
- Krefft, G., "Natural History: The Natural History of New South Wales: Class Arachnida—Spider-like Animals (Continued)", The Sydney Mail, (20 May 1871), p. 377.
- Krefft, G., "Natural History: The Natural History of New South Wales: Spider-like Animals—(Continued)", The Sydney Mail, (27 May 1871), p. 394.
- Krefft, G., "Worms in Sheep", The Sydney Mail, (3 June 1871), p. 423.
  - Krefft, G., "To the Editor of the Sydney Mail (on Worms in Sheep)", The Sydney Mail, (3 June 1871), p. 423.
  - Morris, W., "To the Editor of the Sydney Mail (on Worms in Sheep)", The Sydney Mail, (17 June 1871), p. 495.
- Krefft, G., "Natural History: The Natural History of New South Wales: Spiders and Spider-like Animals—(Continued)", The Sydney Mail, (3 June 1871), p. 426.
- Krefft, G., "Natural History: The Natural History of New South Wales: Entozoa—(Continued)", The Sydney Mail, (10 June 1871), p. 471.
- Krefft, G., "Natural History: The Natural History of New South Wales: Entozoa, or Intestinal Worms—(Continued)", The Sydney Mail, (17 June 1871), p. 491.
- Krefft, G., "Natural History: The Natural History of New South Wales: Entozoa, or Intestinal Worms—(Continued)", The Sydney Mail, (24 June 1871), p. 526.
- Krefft, G., "Natural History: The Natural History of New South Wales: Entozoa—(Continued)"], The Sydney Mail, (1 July 1871), pp. 554—555.
- Krefft, G., "Natural History: The Natural History of New South Wales: Entozoa—(Continued)", The Sydney Mail, (8 July 1871), p. 590.
- Krefft, G., "Natural History: The Natural History of New South Wales: Entozoa—(Continued)", The Sydney Mail, (15 July 1871), p. 633.
- Krefft, G., "Natural History: The Natural History of New South Wales: Entozoa—(Conclusion)", The Sydney Mail, (22 July 1871), p. 665.
- Krefft, G., "Natural History: The Natural History of New South Wales: Annelidæ", The Sydney Mail, (29 July 1871), p. 697.
- Krefft, G., "Natural History: The Megatherium", The Sydney Mail, (5 August 1871), p. 722.
- Krefft, G., "Natural History: The Natural History of New South Wales: Annelidæ—(Continued)", The Sydney Mail, (12 August 1871), p. 747.
- Krefft, G., "Natural History: The Natural History of New South Wales: Annelidæ—(Continued)", The Sydney Mail, (19 August 1871), p. 791.
- Krefft, G., "Natural History: The Natural History of New South Wales: Annelidæ—(Continued)", The Sydney Mail, (26 August 1871), p. 822.
- Krefft, G., "Natural History: The Natural History of New South Wales: Annelidæ—(Continued)", The Sydney Mail, (9 September 1871), p. 871.
- Krefft, G., "Natural History: The Natural History of New South Wales: Annelidæ—(Conclusion)", The Sydney Mail, (16 September 1871), p. 905.
- Krefft, G., "Natural History: The Natural History of New South Wales: Class Insecta—Order Coleoptera", The Sydney Mail, (23 September 1871), p. 957.
- Krefft, G., "Natural History: The Natural History of New South Wales: Class Insecta—Order Coleoptera—(Continued)", The Sydney Mail, (30 September 1871), p. 967.
- Krefft, G., "Natural History: The Natural History of New South Wales: Coleoptera—(Continued)", The Sydney Mail, (7 October 1871), p. 1011.
- Krefft, G., "Natural History: The Natural History of New South Wales: Entomology—(Continued)", The Sydney Mail, (14 October 1871), p. 1033.
- Krefft, G., "Natural History: The Natural History of New South Wales", The Sydney Mail, (21 October 1871), p. 1063.
- Krefft, G., "Natural History: The Natural History of New South Wales", The Sydney Mail, (28 October 1871), p. 1117.
- Krefft, G., "Natural History: The Natural History of New South Wales: (Entomology Continued) Fam. Pselaphidæ", The Sydney Mail, (4 November 1871), p. 1128.
- Krefft, G., "Natural History: The Natural History of New South Wales: "Leather Jackets", "Toad and Coffin Fishes", with a few words about the "Ceratodous" and its Position", The Sydney Mail, (11 November 1871), p. 1161.
- Krefft, G., "Natural History: The Natural History of New South Wales: Entomology—(Continued) Fam. Scaphididæ", The Sydney Mail, (18 November 1871), p. 1211.
- Krefft, G., "Natural History: The Natural History of New South Wales: Entomology—(Continued) Fam. Nitidulidæ", The Sydney Mail, (25 November 1871), p. 1244.
- Krefft, G., "Natural History: Remarks on Australian Whales", The Sydney Mail, (2 December 1871), p. 1256.
- Krefft, G., "Natural History: The Natural History of New South Wales: Entomology—(Continued)", The Sydney Mail, (9 December 1871), p. 1298.
- Krefft, G., "Natural History: The Natural History of New South Wales: "Large Animals", The Sydney Mail, (16 December 1871), p. 1330.
- Krefft, G., "Natural History: The Natural History of New South Wales: Entomology—(Continued) Lamellicornes", The Sydney Mail, (30 December 1871), p. 1244.
- Krefft, G., "Natural History: The Natural History of New South Wales: Entomology—(Continued)", The Sydney Mail, (6 January 1872), p. 9.
- Krefft, G., "Natural History: The Natural History of New South Wales: Entomology—(Continued)", The Sydney Mail, (13 January 1872), p. 51.
- Krefft, G., "Natural History: The Natural History of New South Wales: Entomology—(Continued)", The Sydney Mail, (20 January 1872), p. 88.
- Krefft, G., "Natural History: The Natural History of New South Wales: Entomology—(Continued)", The Sydney Mail, (27 January 1872), p. 104.
- Krefft, G., "Natural History: The Natural History of New South Wales: Entomology—(Continued)", The Sydney Mail, (3 February 1872), p. 137.
- Krefft, G., "Natural History: The Natural History of New South Wales: Entomology—(Continued)", The Sydney Mail, (10 February 1872), pp. 168—169.
- Krefft, G., "Natural History: The Natural History of New South Wales: Entomology—(Continued)", The Sydney Mail, (9 March 1872), p. 296.
- Krefft, G., "Natural History: The Natural History of New South Wales: Entomology—(Continued)", The Sydney Mail, (16 March 1872), p. 338.
- Krefft, G., "Natural History: The Natural History of New South Wales: Entomology—(Continued)", The Sydney Mail, (30 March 1872), p. 411.
- Krefft, G., "Natural History: The Wombats", The Sydney Mail, (6 April 1872), p. 426.
- Krefft, G., "Natural History: The Phalanger Tribe: Comprising the Animals known as Opossums, Flying Squirrel, Sugar Squirrels, Flying Mice, Dromicias, and Tarsiers", The Sydney Mail, (13 April 1872), p. 455.
- Krefft, G., "Natural History: The Phalanger Tribe—(Continued) The Koala or Native Bear (Phascolarctos cinereus", The Sydney Mail, (20 April 1872), p. 488.
- Krefft, G., "Natural History: The Phalanger Tribe—(Continued)", The Sydney Mail, (27 April 1872), p. 520.
- Krefft, G., "Natural History: A Cuvierian Principle in Palæeontology, tested by evidences of an extinct Leonine Marsupial ("Thylacoleo carnifex"), by Professor Owen, F.R.S., D.C.L., Foreign Associate of the Institute of France", The Sydney Mail, (18 May 1872), pp. 626—627.
  - Krefft, G., "A Cuvierian Principle in Palæeontology, tested by evidences of an extinct Leonine Marsupial ("Thylacoleo carnifex"), by Professor Owen, F.R.S., D.C.L., Foreign Associate of the Institute of France. (From the Sydney Mail, May 18, 1872, with corrections and the illustrations communicated by the Author.)", Annals and Magazine of Natural History, Vol.10, No.57, (September 1872), pp. 169–182.
- Krefft, G., "Natural History: The Phalanger Tribe—(Continued)", The Sydney Mail, (25 May 1872), p. 649.
- Krefft, G., "Natural History: The Phalanger Tribe—(Continued)", The Sydney Mail, (1 June 1872), p. 681.
- Krefft, G., "Natural History: The Phalanger Tribe—(Continued)", The Sydney Mail, (8 June 1872), p. 713.
- Krefft, G., "Natural History: The Phalanger Tribe—(Continued)", The Sydney Mail, (22 June 1872), p. 777.
- Krefft, G., "Natural History: The Phalanger Tribe—(Continued)", The Sydney Mail, (29 June 1872), p. 821.
- Krefft, G., "Natural History: The Phalanger Tribe—(Concluded)", The Sydney Mail, (6 July 1872), p. 9.
- Krefft, G., "Natural History: The Kangaroo Tribe", The Sydney Mail, (13 July 1872), p. 40.
- Krefft, G., "Natural History: Description of the Illustrations", The Sydney Mail, (20 July 1872), p. 73.
- Krefft, G., "Natural History: The Kangaroo Tribe—(Continued)", The Sydney Mail, (27 July 1872), p. 104.
- Krefft, G., "Natural History: The Kangaroo Tribe—(Continued)", The Sydney Mail, (3 August 1872), p. 137.
- Krefft, G., "Natural History: The Kangaroo Tribe—(Continued)", The Sydney Mail, (10 August 1872), p. 169.
- Krefft, G., "Natural History: The Kangaroo Tribe—(Continued)", The Sydney Mail, (17 August 1872), p. 201.
- Krefft, G., "Natural History: The Kangaroo Tribe—(Continued)", The Sydney Mail, (24 August 1872), p. 248.
- Krefft, G., "Natural History: The Kangaroo Tribe—(Continued)", The Sydney Mail, (7 September 1872), p. 310.
- Krefft, G., "Natural History: The Kangaroo Tribe—(Continued) Fossil Species", The Sydney Mail, (14 September 1872), p. 327.
- Krefft, G., "Natural History: The Natural History of New South Wales: The Bandicoot Tribe (Peramelidæ)", The Sydney Mail, (21 September 1872), p. 374.
- Krefft, G., "Natural History: The Natural History of New South Wales: The Bandicoot Tribe—(Continued)", The Sydney Mail, (28 September 1872), p. 406.
- Krefft, G., "To the Editor of the Sydney Mail (on 'Fabulous Australian Animals')", The Sydney Mail, (5 October 1872), p. 422.
- Krefft, G., "Natural History: The Natural History of New South Wales: The Bandicoot Tribe—(Continued)", The Sydney Mail, (5 October 1872), p. 422.
- Krefft, G., "Natural History: The Natural History of New South Wales: The Native Cat Family, or Dasyuridæ", The Sydney Mail, (12 October 1872), p. 461.
- Krefft, G., "Natural History: The Natural History of New South Wales: The Native Cat Family, or Dasyuridæ (Continued)", The Sydney Mail, (19 October 1872), p. 494.
- Krefft, G., "Natural History: The Natural History of New South Wales: The Native Cat Family, or Dasyuridæ (Continued)", The Sydney Mail, (26 October 1872), p. 534.
- Krefft, G., "Natural History: The Natural History of New South Wales: The Native Cat Family, or Dasyuridæ (Continued)", The Sydney Mail, (2 November 1872), p. 554.
- Krefft, G., "Natural History: The Natural History of New South Wales: The Native Cat Family, or Dasyuridæ (Continued)", The Sydney Mail, (9 November 1872), p. 598.
- Krefft, G., "Natural History: The Natural History of New South Wales: The Native Cat Family, or Dasyuridæ (Concluded)", The Sydney Mail, (16 November 1872), p. 630.
- Krefft, G., "Natural History: The Natural History of New South Wales: The Native Cat Family, or Dasyuridæ (Concluded)", The Sydney Mail, (30 November 1872), p. 682.
- Krefft, G., "Natural History: American and Asian Marsupials", The Sydney Mail, (7 December 1872), p. 714.
- Krefft, G., "Natural History: Section Monotremata", The Sydney Mail, (14 December 1872), p. 745.
- Krefft, G., "Natural History: Section Monotremata—(Continued)", The Sydney Mail, (28 December 1872), p. 808.
- Krefft, G., "The Illustration: Chœtocercus Cristicauda (Spiny tailed Dasyure)", The Sydney Mail, (28 December 1872), p. 808.
- Krefft, G., "Natural History: Remarks on Australian Crocodiles", The Sydney Mail, (4 January 1873), p. 8.
- Krefft, G., "Natural History: Section Monotremata—(Continued)", The Sydney Mail, (11 January 1873), p. 40.
- Krefft, G., "Natural History: Section Monotremata—(Concluded)", The Sydney Mail, (18 January 1873), p. 74.
- Krefft, G., "Natural History: Mammals without a Pouch", The Sydney Mail, (25 January 1873), p. 111.
- Krefft, G., "Natural History: Australian Pouchless Mammals—(Continued)", The Sydney Mail, (1 February 1873), p. 137.
- Krefft, G., "Natural History: Australian Pouchless Mammals—(Continued)", The Sydney Mail, (8 February 1873), p. 169.
- Krefft, G., "Natural History: Australian Pouchless Mammals—(Continued)", The Sydney Mail, (15 February 1873), p. 202.
- Krefft, G., "Natural History: Ground Rats", The Sydney Mail, (22 February 1873), p. 234.
- Krefft, G., "Natural History: Ground Rats—(Continued)", The Sydney Mail, (1 March 1873), p. 277.
- Krefft, G., "Natural History: The Goats (Genus Capra.)", The Sydney Mail, (8 March 1873), p. 298.
- Krefft, G., "Natural History: The Bovine Tribe, of Oxen (Genus Bos.)", The Sydney Mail, (8 March 1873), p. 298.
- Krefft, G., "Natural History: The Ruminants—(Concluded); The Camel Tribe (Camelidæ); Family Solidungula, the Horse Tribe", The Sydney Mail, (15 March 1873), p. 343.
- Krefft, G., "Natural History: The Horse Tribe—(Continued)", The Sydney Mail, (29 March 1873), p. 392.
- Krefft, G., "Natural History: The Horse Tribe—(Concluded)", The Sydney Mail, (19 April 1873), p. 503.
- Krefft, G., "Natural History: Order Multungula: Many-hoofed Animals or Pachyderms", The Sydney Mail, (19 April 1873), p. 503.
- Krefft, G., "Natural History: The Hog Tribe—(Continued)", The Sydney Mail, (26 April 1873), p. 532.
- Krefft, G., "Natural History: The Felidæ, or The Cat Tribe", The Sydney Mail, (3 May 1873), p. 554.
- Krefft, G., "Natural History: The Dog Tribe (Canidæ)", The Sydney Mail, (3 May 1873), p. 554.
- Krefft, G., "Natural History: The Canidæ, or Dog Tribe—(Continued)", The Sydney Mail, (10 May 1873), p. 596.
- Krefft, G., "Natural History: The Canidæ, or Dog Tribe—(Continued)", The Sydney Mail, (17 May 1873), p. 618.
- Krefft, G., "Natural History: The Canidæ, or Dog Tribe—(Concluded)", The Sydney Mail, (24 May 1873), p. 660.
- Krefft, G., "Natural History: The Seal Tribe, or Carnivorous Amphibians (Fam. Phocidæ)", The Sydney Mail, (31 May 1873), p. 687.
- Krefft, G., "Natural History: The Seal Tribe—(Continued)", The Sydney Mail, (7 June 1873), p. 728.
- Krefft, G., "Natural History: The Seal Tribe—(Continued)", The Sydney Mail, (14 June 1873), p. 746.
- Krefft, G., "Natural History: Birds with Teeth and numerous Tail Vertebræ, and Thoughts on Modern Classification", The Sydney Mail, (21 June 1873), p. 778.
- Krefft, G., "Natural History: Remarks on some New Additions to the Fauna of Australia", The Sydney Mail, (28 June 1873), p. 814.
- Krefft, G., "Natural History: Remarks on New Creations", The Sydney Mail, (5 July 1873), p. 20.
- Krefft, G., "Natural History: Remarks on New Hypotheses", The Sydney Mail, (12 July 1873), p. 46.
- Krefft, G., "Natural History: Savages, Fossil and Recent", The Sydney Mail, (19 July 1873), p. 74.
- Krefft, G., "Natural History: Savages, Fossil and Recent", The Sydney Mail, (26 July 1873), p. 106.
- Krefft, G., "Natural History: Savages, Fossil and Recent", The Sydney Mail, (2 August 1873), p. 142.
- Krefft, G., "Natural History: Savages, Fossil and Recent", The Sydney Mail, (16 August 1873), p. 210.
- Krefft, G., "Natural History: Review of Professor Owen's Papers on the Fossil Mammals of Australia", The Sydney Mail, (23 August 1873), p. 238.
- Krefft, G., "Natural History: Fossil Australian Mammals, and a few Remarks on their Classification", The Sydney Mail, (6 September 1873), p. 302.
- Krefft, G., "Natural History: The Seal Tribe—(Continued)", The Sydney Mail, (13 September 1873), p. 334.
- Krefft, G., "Natural History: The Seal Tribe—(Concluded)", The Sydney Mail, (20 September 1873), p. 366.
- Krefft, G., "Review: Mammalia: Recent and Extinct: An Elementary Treatise for the Use of the Public Schools of New South Wales, by A. W. Scott, M.A. Sydney: Government Printing Office, 1873", The Sydney Mail, (20 September 1873), p. 366.
- Krefft, G., "Natural History: The Whale Tribe: Order Cetacea", The Sydney Mail, (4 October 1873), p. 434.
- Krefft, G., "Natural History: The Whale Tribe—(Concluded)", The Sydney Mail, (11 October 1873), p. 466.
- Krefft, G., "Natural History: The Bats, or Cheiroptera", The Sydney Mail, (18 October 1873), p. 498.
- Krefft, G., "Natural History: The Bat Tribe—(Continued)", The Sydney Mail, (25 October 1873), p. 542.
- Krefft, G., "Natural History: Mammals of Australia and their Classification: Part I. — Ornithodelphia and Didelphia", The Sydney Mail, (8 November 1873), pp. 594—595.
  - Krefft, G., "Plate 1: Australian Fossil Remains: Jaws and Teeth of two gigantic Phalangers, Diprotodon Bennetti (Krefft) and Diprotodon Australis (Owen)", Supplement to The Sydney Mail, (8 November 1873), p. 1.
- Krefft, G., "Natural History: Mammals of Australia and their Classification: Part II. — Monodelphia", The Sydney Mail, (15 November 1873), p. 638.
- Krefft, G., "Natural History: The Bat Tribe—(Continued)", The Sydney Mail, (22 November 1873), p. 659.
- Krefft, G., "Natural History: The Bat Tribe—(Continued) Section II.—Insectivorous Bats", The Sydney Mail, (29 November 1873), p. 694.
- Krefft, G., "Natural History: The Bat Tribe—(Continued) Horseshoe-nosed Bats, Fam. Phyllostomata", The Sydney Mail, (6 December 1873), p. 725.
- Krefft, G., "Natural History: Order Primates: Fam. Hominidæ: Genus Homo (Man)", The Sydney Mail, (20 December 1873), p. 783.
- Krefft, G., "Natural History: The Birds", The Sydney Mail, (27 December 1873), p. 815.
- Krefft, G., "Natural History: The Birds", The Sydney Mail, (3 January 1874), p. 16.
- Krefft, G., "Natural History: The Birds—(Continued)", The Sydney Mail, (17 January 1874), p. 82.
- Krefft, G., "Natural History: The Birds—(Continued) Natatores, or Swimmers: Fam. Spheniscidæ, or Penguins", The Sydney Mail, (24 January 1874), p. 126.
- Krefft, G., "Natural History: The Birds—(Continued)", The Sydney Mail, (31 January 1874), p. 146.
- Krefft, G., "Natural History: The Birds—(Continued)", The Sydney Mail, (7 February 1874), p. 178.
- Krefft, G., "Natural History: The Birds—(Continued)", The Sydney Mail, (14 February 1874), p. 215.
- Krefft, G., "Natural History: The Birds—(Continued): Family Pelicanidæ, The Pelicans", The Sydney Mail, (21 February 1874), p. 241.
- Krefft, G., "Natural History: The Yellow-Winged Satin Bird (Letter to the Editor)", The Sydney Mail, (28 February 1874), p. 272.
  - 'Philo-Veritas', "To the Editor of the Mail", The Sydney Mail, (21 February 1874), p. 241.
- Krefft, G., "Natural History: Notes on the Yellow-Winged Satin Bird and Professor C. Wyville's Remarks on the Theory of Evolution", The Sydney Mail, (11 April 1874), p. 474.
- Krefft, G., "Natural History: Our Geographical Relationship to South America", The Sydney Mail, (18 April 1874), p. 497.
- Krefft, G., "Natural History: The Uncommon Frog", The Sydney Mail, (9 May 1874), p. 596.
  - Mivart, G., "Natural History: The Common Frog—I", The Sydney Mail, (7 March 1874), pp. 304—305.
  - Mivart, G., "Natural History: The Common Frog—II (Continued)", The Sydney Mail, (14 March 1874), p. 339.
  - Mivart, G., "Natural History: The Common Frog—III (Continued)", The Sydney Mail, (21 March 1874), p. 387.
  - Mivart, G., "Natural History: The Common Frog—IV (Continued)", The Sydney Mail, (28 March 1874), p. 399.
  - Mivart, G., "Natural History: The Common Frog—V (Concluded)", The Sydney Mail, (2 May 1874), p. 561.
- Krefft, G., "Natural History: The Uncommon Frog", The Sydney Mail, (23 May 1874), p. 658.
- Krefft, G., "Natural History: The Uncommon Frog", The Sydney Mail, (30 May 1874), p. 694.
- Krefft, G., "Natural History: The Uncommon Frog", The Sydney Mail, (6 June 1874), p. 722.
- Krefft, G., "Natural History: The Uncommon Frog: Family Cystignathidæ", The Sydney Mail, (13 June 1874), p. 758.
- Krefft, G., "Natural History: The Uncommon Frog: Family Eurystomatidæ", The Sydney Mail, (27 June 1874), p. 818.
  - This was Krefft's last contribution as Curator of the Australian Museum.
- Krefft, G., "Natural History: The Reptiles of Australia: Recent and Fossil", The Sydney Mail, (17 October 1874), p. 497.
  - This was Krefft's first contribution following his dismissal from the Australian Museum.
- Krefft, G., "Natural History: The Reptiles of Australia: Recent and Fossil", The Sydney Mail, (24 October 1874), p. 527.
- Krefft, G., "Natural History: The Reptiles of Australia: Recent and Fossil", The Sydney Mail, (31 October 1874), p. 553.
- Krefft, G., "Natural History: The Reptiles of Australia: Recent and Fossil", The Sydney Mail, (7 November 1874), p. 587.
- Krefft, G., "Natural History: The Reptiles of Australia: Recent and Fossil", The Sydney Mail, (14 November 1874), p. 630.
- Krefft, G., "Natural History: The Reptiles of Australia: Recent and Fossil—Snakes (Continued)", The Sydney Mail, (21 November 1874), p. 649.
- Krefft, G., "Natural History: The Reptiles of Australia: Recent and Fossil: Family of Blind Snakes. Typhlopidla", The Sydney Mail, (28 November 1874), p. 687.
- Krefft, G., "Natural History: The Reptiles of Australia: Recent and Fossil: Remarks on the Development of Reptiles during the various Periods of the Earth's Existence", The Sydney Mail, (5 December 1874), p. 713.
- Krefft, G., "Natural History: The Reptiles of Australia: Recent and Fossil", The Sydney Mail, (12 December 1874), p. 756.
- Krefft, G., "On the Causes through which Large Groups of Animals become Extinct", The Sydney Mail, (12 December 1874), p. 756.
- Krefft, G., "Natural History: The Reptiles of Australia: Recent and Fossil", The Sydney Mail, (19 December 1874), p. 788.
- Krefft, G., "Natural History: Remarks on Professor Owen's Arrangement of the Fossil Kangaroos", The Sydney Mail, (26 December 1874), p. 809.
- Krefft, G., "Natural History: Remarks on Professor Owen's Arrangement of the Fossil Kangaroos", The Sydney Mail, (9 January 1875), p. 42.
- Krefft, G., "Natural History: Spiders of Australia: Remarks on Dr. L. Koch's "Spiders of Australia", and Further Notes on the "Development Theory", The Sydney Mail, (16 January 1875), p. 84.
- Krefft, G., "Natural History: The Reptiles of Australia: Recent and Fossil: The Rock Snakes—(Continued)", The Sydney Mail, (23 January 1875), p. 105.
- Krefft, G., "Natural History: Animal Life in the Far North", The Sydney Mail, (30 January 1875), p. 138.
- Krefft, G., "Natural History: The Fauna of the Far North (Concluded), and a few Notices on the Flora added", The Sydney Mail, (6 February 1875), p. 171.
- Krefft, G., "Natural History: The Fauna of the Far North (Concluded), and a few Notices on the Flora added: Birds"], The Sydney Mail, (13 February 1875), pp. 206—207.
- Krefft, G., "Natural History: The Reptiles of Australia: Recent and Fossil: The Rock Snakes—(Continued)", The Sydney Mail, (20 February 1875), p. 234.
- Krefft, G., "Natural History: The Reptiles of Australia: Recent and Fossil: The Rock Snakes—(Concluded)", The Sydney Mail, (27 February 1875), p. 266.
- Krefft, G., "Natural History: Remarks on the Alteration of Organisms", The Sydney Mail, (6 March 1875), p. 308.
- Krefft, G., "Natural History: Remarks on the Alteration of Organisms—(Continued)", The Sydney Mail, (13 March 1875), p. 341.
- Krefft, G., "Natural History: Remarks on the Alteration of Organisms—(Continued)", The Sydney Mail, (20 March 1875), p. 371.
- Krefft, G., "Natural History: Remarks on the Alteration of Organisms—(Continued)", The Sydney Mail, (27 March 1875), p. 394.
- Krefft, G., "Natural History: Remarks on the Alteration of Organisms—(Continued)", The Sydney Mail, (3 April 1875), p. 425.
- Krefft, G., "Natural History: Remarks on the Alteration of Organisms—(Continued)", The Sydney Mail, (10 April 1875), pp. 458—459.
- Krefft, G., "Natural History: Remarks on the Alteration of Organisms—(Continued)", The Sydney Mail, (17 April 1875), p. 490.
- Krefft, G., "Natural History: Remarks on the Alteration of Organisms—(Continued)", The Sydney Mail, (24 April 1875), p. 527.
- Krefft, G., "Natural History: Remarks on the Alteration of Organisms—(Continued)", The Sydney Mail, (1 May 1875), p. 558.
- Krefft, G., "Natural History: Remarks on the Alteration of Organisms—(Continued)", The Sydney Mail, (8 May 1875), p. 590.
- Krefft, G., "Natural History: Remarks on the Alteration of Organisms—(Continued)", The Sydney Mail, (15 May 1875), p. 618.
- Krefft, G., "Natural History: Remarks on the Alteration of Organisms—(Continued)", The Sydney Mail, (22 May 1875), p. 663.
- Krefft, G., "Natural History: Remarks on the Alteration of Organisms—(Continued)", The Sydney Mail, (29 May 1875), p. 686.
- Krefft, G., "Natural History: Remarks on the Alteration of Organisms—(Continued)", The Sydney Mail, (5 June 1875), p. 714.
- Krefft, G., "Natural History: Remarks on the Alteration of Organisms—(Continued)", The Sydney Mail, (12 June 1875), p. 747.
- Krefft, G., "Natural History: Remarks on the Alteration of Organisms—(Continued)", The Sydney Mail, (19 June 1875), p. 778.
- Krefft, G., "Natural History: Remarks on the Alteration of Organisms—(Continued)", The Sydney Mail, (26 June 1875), p. 809.

== See also ==
- Krefft's "Natural History" articles in The Sydney Mail
