= Clean money =

Clean money may refer to:

- Money for publicly funded elections
- Money that appears to have been acquired legitimately; see Money laundering

== See also ==
- Dirty Money (disambiguation)
