= Black money (disambiguation) =

Black money is income earned surreptitiously or illegally, usually in cash, and not reported to the government so as to avoid paying taxes on it.

Black money may also refer to:

- Black Money, a 2025 Bangladeshi web series by Raihan Rafi
- Black Money (film), a 2019 South Korean crime drama
- Black Money (novel), a 1966 novel by Ross Macdonald
- "Black Money", an early 1980s UK single by Culture Club
- Black Money Records, a record label owned by Digga D
- Black money scam, a confidence trick
- Indian black money, connected to tax avoidance in the country

== See also ==
- Dark money (disambiguation)
- Dirty Money (disambiguation)
- Commando 2: The Black Money Trail, a 2017 Indian action film
