= Ian Kiernan =

Australian yachtsman (1940–2018)

Ian Kiernan AO
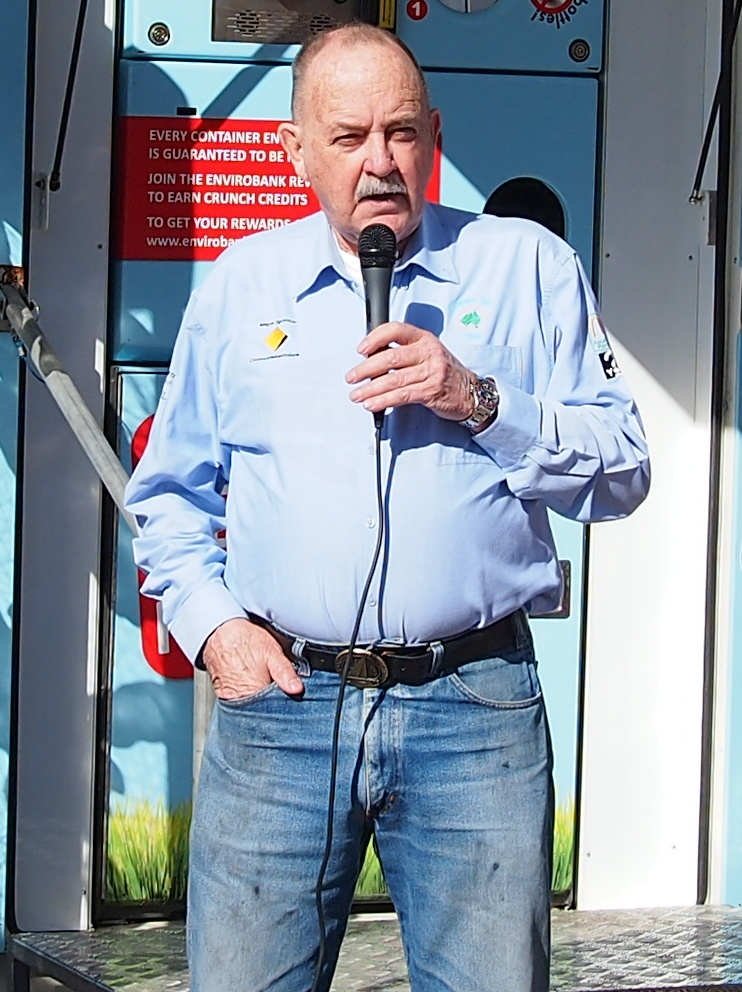
- Kiernan in 2013
- Born: Ian Bruce Carrick Kiernan; 4 October 1940; Sydney, New South Wales, Australia
- Died: 16 October 2018 (aged 78); Sydney, New South Wales, Australia
- Occupations: Environmentalist, property developer, builder
- Years active: 1993–2018
- Known for: Clean Up Australia and Clean Up the World movements

Ian Bruce Carrick Kiernan AO (4 October 1940 – 16 October 2018) was an Australian yachtsman, property developer, builder, and environmental campaigner. He is known for co-founding with Kim McKay the not-for-profit Clean Up Australia campaign in 1989, which developed into a global campaign in 1993.

== Early life and education ==
Ian Bruce Carrick Kiernan was born on 4 October 1940 in Sydney, New South Wales, to George Arthur and Leslie Katherine Kiernan.

He was educated at The Scots College in Sydney, The Armidale School in northern New South Wales, and the Sydney Technical College, where he trained as a builder.

== Career ==
=== Property ===
Kiernan became a property developer, who owned a number of dwellings in the Sydney suburb of Redfern. He acquired around half of the housing in The Block in the early 1970s via his company Tierra del Fuego. After lobbying by local residents, the Whitlam government persuaded Kiernan and others to sell their properties to the government, leading to the establishment of the Aboriginal Housing Company, which managed The Block from then on. Kiernan's construction company, IBK Construction Pty Ltd, sold the houses at a cost price and was tasked with redeveloping the site, promising to hire additional Aboriginal people to complete the work. Kiernan said that he would not be making a profit, and saw it as "our contribution, and because we think people should get behind a responsible government which is doing something for the under-privileged".

=== Boating ===
Kiernan was also a yachtsman, sailing competitively for more than 40 years and representing Australia at the Admiral's, Southern Cross, Dunhill, Clipper, Kenwood, and Trans-Pacific Cup competitions.

In 1986/87 Kiernan represented Australia in the BOC Challenge solo around-the-world yacht race. He finished 6th out of a fleet of 25 yachts from 11 countries, setting an Australian record for a solo circumnavigation of the world.

=== Clean Up ===
During the BOC Challenge yacht race, Kiernan was appalled by the amount of rubbish choking the world's oceans. The first "Clean Up" event, called "Clean Up Lake Macquarie", was instigated in 1987 by Ivan Welsh as mayor of Lake Macquarie. In 1988, with Kim McKay, and the support of a committee of friends, Kiernan organised "Clean Up Sydney Harbour" on Sunday 8 January 1989. Around 40,000 volunteers turned out to help, and collected over 5000 tonnes. Clean Up Australia Day was first held in January 1990. The success of the 1989 event sparked national interest.

The first "Clean Up the World" event took place in 1993. By 2007 some 35 million people from 80 nations turned out to clean up their part of the world and in 2017 it was estimated that 120 nations took part. By the time of Kiernan's death in 2018, more than 21 million people had participated in annual Clean Up Australia Days, Friday Schools Clean Up Days, and Business Clean Ups in Australia.

== Awards ==
Kiernan's environmental efforts were recognised in 1991 when the Australian Government awarded him the Medal of the Order of Australia (OAM). He was awarded Australian of the Year in 1994. During the ceremony he assisted the Premier of New South Wales, John Fahey, in stopping a "pseudo assassination" attempt on Charles, Prince of Wales.

In 1995, he was appointed an Officer of the Order of Australia (AO).

In 1998, Kiernan was the recipient of the UNEP Sasakawa Prize. The prize is awarded every year to individuals with an established track record of achievement and the potential to make outstanding contributions to the protection and management of the environment consistent with UNEP's policies and objectives. He received the World Citizenship Award from the World Association of Girl Guides and Girl Scouts in 1999.

In 2001, Kiernan was awarded the Centenary Medal for "service to the Clean Up Australia Campaign and the Clean up the World Campaign".

In 2006 Kiernan received a Lifetime Achievement Award from the National Trust of Australia (NSW).

The 2007 Reader's Digest "Most Trusted Poll" voted Clean Up Australia as the country's most trusted environmental charity and Kiernan as the fourth "most trustworthy" Australian. In 2008 in the same poll Kiernan was ranked number three.

Kiernan was also the recipient of the Toastmasters International Communications and Leadership Award, the Berger-Sullivan Tourism Award, the International Banksia Award, and the 1999 Building World Citizenship Award.

== Personal life and death ==
In 2014, Kiernan pleaded guilty to a DUI charge in Sydney, following a previous charge for the same offence in 1998. This record was cited by the government of New South Wales when Kiernan was overlooked for the honour of having a Sydney ferry named after him.

He died on 16 October 2018 in Sydney at the age of 78. He is survived by his daughters Sally and Pip and son Jack.
