= Frank Howarth (public servant) =

Australian public servant

Frank Howarth AM, PSM

16th Director of the Australian Museum
- In office February 2004 – February 2014
- Nominated by: Government of New South Wales
- Preceded by: Mike Archer
- Succeeded by: Kim McKay

Personal details
- Born: 24 October 1951 (age 74) Sydney, Australia
- Spouse: Peter
- Education: Newington College
- Alma mater: Macquarie University (BA Hons); University of New South Wales (MScSoc)
- Profession: Retired Public servant

Frank Richard Howarth, AM, PSM (born 24 October 1951) is a retired Australian public servant who served as the director of the Australian Museum from February 2004 to February 2014. He previously was the national president and chair of the Council of Museums Galleries Australia and Chair of the NSW Heritage Council.

== Early life and education ==
Howarth was born in Sydney and educated at Newington College (1963-1969), commencing as a preparatory school student in Wyvern House. As his family lived on the lower North Shore of Sydney, on the northern side of the Parramatta River, Howarth eschewed traditional GPS sport and chose to sail instead. He gained a geology degree from Macquarie University and a Master of Science and Society from the University of New South Wales.

== Public service career ==
In 1981 Howarth joined the New South Wales public service. He has had a long career in the public sector. In 1996 he became Director and Chief Executive of the Royal Botanic Gardens and Domain Trust, before taking up the role of Director of the Australian Museum in 2004. He stepped down as Director in April 2014. He was Chair of the International Council of Museums (Australia) from 2010 to 2013; a member of the Council of Australasian Museum Directors from 2004 to 2014; and was National President of Museums Galleries Australia from 2013 to 2017. He was awarded the Public Service Medal in 2012. He is currently a director of several not for profit organisations including the Australian Design Centre, Jervis Bay Maritime Museum, and the tourism promotion organisation Destination Sydney Surrounds South. He is a member of the Reference Group for the National Aboriginal Art Gallery proposed for Alice Springs. Since leaving the Australian Museum, he had developed his interests in strengthening cultural leadership and innovation. His consulting work is focussed on strategy, governance, tourism and philanthropy. He became an adjunct professor in the University of Technology, Sydney Business School in 2017 in order to pursue his interest in how arts and culture can foster business innovation.

== Private life ==
On 24 June 1978, Howarth attended the protest that led to the Sydney Mardi Gras and was shocked when The Sydney Morning Herald published in full the names of those arrested, leading to many people being outed to their friends and places of employment. Howarth and his long-term partner, Peter, live in an inner-city eastern suburb of Sydney.

== Honours ==
- Public Service Medal – 2012 Queen's Birthday Honours list for outstanding public service to the Australian Museum in Sydney
- Member of the Order of Australia – 2020 Queen's Birthday Honours, for significant service to the visual arts through the museums and galleries sector.
