= Clean Up Australia =

Australian environmental organisation

Clean Up Australia Limited
- Founded: 8 November 1989 (Note: Date of incorporation.)
- Founder: Ian Kiernan, Kim McKay
- Type: environmental conservation
- VAT ID no.: ABN 93 003 884 991
- Registration no.: ACN 003 884 991
- Key people: Ian Kiernan, chairman
- Website: cleanupaustraliaday.org.au

Clean Up Australia Limited is a not-for-profit environmental conservation organisation in Australia. It is registered with the Australian Charities and Not-for-profits Commission.

Clean Up Australia Limited has sponsored a yearly Clean Up Australia Day since 1990. On the first Sunday of March each year, groups of citizens clean up rubbish at different sites across the country. According to the organisation, more than a million people participate each year. Clean Up Australia Limited also supports other environmental efforts, including preventing waste in the environment.

== History ==
Clean Up Australia Day was first held in January 1990. The idea developed from an Australian Bicentenary event, "Clean-Up Lake Macquarie", which was instigated in 1987 by Ivan Welsh as Mayor of Lake Macquarie. Then followed the local "Clean Up Sydney Harbour" event in 1989, organised by Ian Kiernan and Kim McKay, with more than 40,000 volunteers who collected approximately 5,000 tonnes of rubbish. The 1990 Clean Up Australia Day event was launched by the then prime minister, Bob Hawke, over the initial opposition of the then state premier, Nick Greiner. Greiner later reversed his position and offered his support for the event.

"The Rubbish Report" was produced each year from data collected by surveying participants. As of 1990, 94% of rubbish was from packaging. By 1993, the campaign was focusing more strongly on sorting the rubbish collected into recyclables, and Kiernan was using Clean Up Australia Day to advocate for changes to legislation surrounding reduction of packaging and returning packaging to companies. In 1994, over 8,000 sites were cleaned up as part of the day. In 2008, Kiernan put a focus on bottled water, advocating for the expansion of container deposit refunds in Australia.

In 2012, sponsorship cutbacks and a drop in private donations caused the organisation to have to dismiss all of its paid staff.

== Clean Up the World ==
Clean Up the World was established in 1994 after Ian Kiernan and Kim McKay approached the United Nations Environment Programme, with an idea to take his Clean Up concept global.

A Clean Up the World weekend is held on the third weekend of September each year and, by 2007, the event attracted more than 35 million people from over 120 countries to volunteer.

== Other campaigns and projects ==
=== Business Clean Up Day ===
Business Clean Up Day provides Australian businesses with an opportunity to contribute to waste reduction and the improvement of the environment.

Businesses register their commitment to implement at least one environment-friendly initiative in their workplace, giving them an opportunity to work as a team and make a difference to their local environment.

=== Schools Clean Up Day ===
Schools Clean Up Day is designed to allow students to participate in Clean Up Australia as part of a school activity.

=== Clean Up the Kimberley ===
Clean Up the Kimberley is a series of community action-based projects focussed on the Kimberley region of Western Australia. The primary objectives of this initiative are to clean up rubbish hot spots, increase awareness of the scale and impact of rubbish in the region, change tourist and local community behaviour and improve local recycling and waste management infrastructure.

=== Clean Up the Alps ===
Clean Up the Alps is a project aimed at protecting the Alpine region of Victoria. It is run in conjunction with Parks Victoria, Conservation Volunteers Australia, and local communities as part of the Victorian Government's 'The Alps: A fresh start – a healthy future' program. The project culminates in the Clean Up the Alps weekend, held annually in November.

== See also ==
- Environment of Australia
- Litter in Australia
- Clean-up (environment)
