= DiResta (surname) =

DiResta or di Resta is a surname. Notable people with the surname include:

- Jimmy DiResta (born 1967), American designer, artist, and video producer
- Renée DiResta (born 1981), American misinformation researcher
- Paul di Resta (born 1986), British racing driver
