= Jimmy DiResta =

American television personality (born 1967)

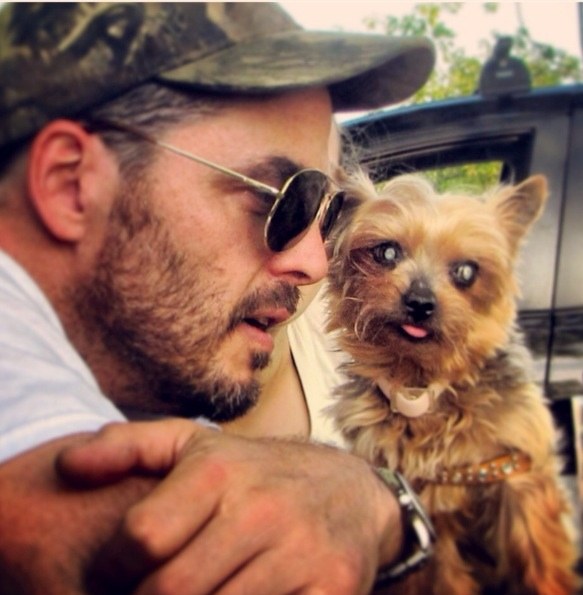
- DiResta with dog, Woody
- Born: Jimmy DiResta; April 3, 1967 (age 59); New York City
- Other name: James Diresta
- Occupations: Designer, artist, fabricator, TV personality
- Years active: 1990–present
- Relatives: John DiResta

James "Jimmy" DiResta (born April 3, 1967) is a New York-based maker, artist, and video producer. He enrolled in the School of Visual Arts in 1986 and graduated in 1990 with a BFA degree. In 1993, he formed a now-defunct toy design company/store called "DiResta" in the East Village which created Gurglin’ Gutz, a rubber toy replicating a miniature human organ. He went on to teach at the School of Visual Arts.

== Career ==
In 2003, DiResta served as set decorator and co-host on "Trash to Cash" with his brother, John DiResta, on Fox Television (FX Network). In 2006, he co-hosted Hammered with John & Jimmy DiResta, on HGTV. The show focused on the marriage of Jimmy's craftsmanship and John's humor. The show's tagline was "Jimmy can make anything and John can make anything funny." In 2009, Jimmy hosted "Against the Grain" on the DIY Network.

In 2011, he co-hosted Dirty Money with his brother, John, on Discovery Channel. The DiResta brothers set out scouring every corner of New York City, from dumpsters to flea markets.

Since his TV career, he has entered the YouTube media business, publishing on the Make: and Core77 channel as well as his own. He co-hosts the weekly "Making It" podcast since October, 2014 together with David Picciuto and Bob Clagett.

In 2016, Make: published a book co-written by Jimmy DiResta and John Baichtal entitled "Workshop Mastery with Jimmy DiResta."

In 2017, DiResta traveled to California to be a part of NBC's Making It, hosted by Amy Poehler and Nick Offerman, as an on-camera helper. Rejecting the name, "The Master Helper", DiResta wanted just to be referred to by name.

DiResta now has the nickname "Jimmy Two Shows" as both his podcast and the show share a name.

Diresta also co-founded The Makers Mob with 6 other youtubers - Frank Howarth , Samurai Carpenter, Jon Peters, Neil Paskin and John Heisz - a paid for subscription service which provides build plans, tutorials, and lessons designed to boost woodworking skills in a wide range of areas.

In 2022, DiResta starred in Making Fun on Netflix.
