= Dirty Money (2011 TV series) =

- Genre: Reality television
- Directed by: Ronnie Krensel
- Presented by: Jimmy DiResta
- Starring: John DiResta; Matt DiResta
- Country of origin: United States
- Original language: English
- No. of seasons: 1
- No. of episodes: 12

Production
- Executive producers: Anthony Amoia; Mike Amoia; French Horwitz
- Production locations: New York, United States
- Running time: 22 Minutes (not including commercials)
- Production companies: V2 Films, INC

Original release
- Network: Discovery Channel
- Release: July 9 – November 16, 2011

Dirty Money is an American reality television show produced by V2 Films and aired on the Discovery Channel. The show features Jimmy DiResta, a New-York-based designer and carpenter, and his brother John DiResta buying or finding discarded and unwanted items and restoring them for sale at their flea market stall.

== Episodes ==
Episode	Titles	Description	Airdate
1	Full Steam Ahead	Jimmy and John search for items at flea markets, where they uncover objects that they can fix and sell on, beginning with an old typewriter.	Aug 9, 2011
2	Gone with the Schwinn	Jimmy and John make a replica Pee-wee Herman schwinn bicycle from some old parts found around the shop, and Jimmy finds an interesting use for some old vinyl records.	Aug 9, 2011
3	The Big Adventure	Tensions soon rise as the boys work with an old bike and a chainsaw to try and create a motorised masterpiece.	Aug 16, 2011
4	A Visit to the Lord	The guys visit the big man of the business, Papa Diresta, and get to work restoring an old gramophone and railway cart.	Aug 16, 2011
5	Soldiers of Fortune	The approach of Fleet Week inspires John and Jimmy Diresta to hunt for some salable military gems - but if they are to make any profits, they must live by the mantra `buy low, modify and sell high'.	Aug 23, 2011
6	Spring into Action	A gang of pogostick enthusiasts nets the Direstas a commissioned Harley-inspired pogo stick sale - but whether this frustrating build makes John push Jimmy on to another item restoration remains to be seen.	Aug 23, 2011
7	Cleared for Payoff	John and Jimmy Diresta meet a businessman who owns an aeronautic graveyard. Jimmy tries to create some unique aviation art, and it seems as though John has met his haggling equal.	Aug 30, 2011
8	Sign of Success	In addition to restoring an old dartboard, a rusty neon bar sign forces the guys to head to a friend's shop for help, before they attempt to hit bulls-eye at the flea market.	Aug 30, 2011
9	Brite Ideas	Jimmy and John get to work making a one-off art piece with Lite-Brite, and some retro Rubik's Cube end tables.	Oct 13, 2011
10	Life in the Cash Lane	John and Jimmy Diresta visit a junkyard, and they are inspired to restore rusted American classics. In the shop, it's a race against time to get things finished for the market.	Nov 14, 2011
11	Coffin Up Big Bucks	Jimmy and John set out to make a one-of-a-kind drinks cabinet from a Victorian coffin.	Nov 15, 2011
12	New York State of Find	The Direstas discover a pile of weathered wood, and they decide to pay homage to the Empire State Building.	Nov 16, 2011

== International Broadcast ==
The show was aired in the United Kingdom on Quest.
