= Frank Howarth (woodworker) =

American Youtuber

- Occupation: YouTuber
- Website: frankmakes.com

Frank Howarth is a former architect, woodworker and YouTuber based in Portland, Oregon. He is known for his DIY, woodworking and woodturning videos that demonstrate his design and building process.

Howarth co-founded The Makers Mob with 6 others - Jimmy Diresta, Samurai Carpenter, Jon Peters, Neil Paskin and John Heisz - offering subscription service that provides plans, tutorials, and lessons designed to boost woodworking skills.
