= Kim McKay =

Australian environmentalist

Kim Coral McKay AO FRSN is an Australian environmentalist, author, entrepreneur, and businesswoman. She co-founded the Clean Up Australia campaign in 1989, and the Clean Up the World campaign in 1992, and also co-created The National Geographic Society's The Genographic Project, the world's largest DNA population study.

== Early life and education ==
Kim Coral McKay was born in Sydney. She attended Mackellar Girls’ High School in Manly Vale.

She attended the University of Technology, Sydney (UTS), graduating in BA Communications.

== Career ==
From 1983 to 1987, McKay was a consultant and then partner at Harfield McKay Communications, where she specialised in major events sponsorship and tourism activities, including The BOC Challenge solo around the world yacht race in 1982/82 and 1986–87. She also worked on Australian Professional Surfing Association events and Law Week for the Law Society of New South Wales.

McKay co-founded the Clean Up Australia campaign in 1989, and the Clean Up the World campaign in 1992, with the support of the United Nations Environment Programme (UNEP). She worked in partnership for 10 years with 1994 Australian of the Year Ian Kiernan AO to develop Clean Up into a leading non-profit community environmental organisation. She served as Deputy Chairwoman from 1989 to 2009 and developed the "Rubbish Report" volunteer citizen science program for data collection and analysis, one of the first "citizen science" community initiatives. Clean Up Australia became one of the largest community environmental projects in Australia, operating in more than 900 cities and towns across the country, involving more than half a million volunteers at its peak.

In 1992, McKay co-founded Clean Up the World, securing a partnership with UNEP to endorse and support the activity, along with international corporate support. The program operates in more than 125 countries and involves many millions of volunteers. McKay, who was also Deputy Chairwoman of Clean Up the World from 1993–2009, told ABC radio that: "The belief that everyone can make a difference is a driving theme behind my actions."

In 1989, McKay established Profile Communications Pty Ltd, a Sydney-based event marketing and communications consultancy. The company focused on special event creation and marketing communications programs, with clients including Discovery Communications and Discovery Channel Eco-Challenge in Cairns. McKay was Managing Director of Profile Communications until 1998, when she closed the company to move to the United States to work for Discovery Communications.

In 1998, McKay joined Discovery Communications, based in Washington D.C., where she oversaw the marketing and communications for Discovery Channel's largest event and documentary production — the Emmy-award-winning Discovery Channel Eco-Challenge, the world's leading adventure sports race. She worked in close collaboration with the Executive Producer and the Race Director Mark Burnett to ensure the successful operation of the extreme sports event, held annually in remote locations around the world, including Morocco and Patagonia.

In 2000, McKay joined National Geographic Channels International, where she was responsible for the global marketing and communications activities for the world's fastest-growing cable channel.

In 2004, McKay returned to Australia to start Momentum2, a Sydney-based marketing and communications agency specialising in major events, corporate sustainability and social responsibility programs. Key clients included National Geographic, Qantas and Harpo Productions (Oprah's Ultimate Australian Adventure).

McKay co-created The Genographic Project with population geneticist Dr Spencer Wells for the National Geographic Society, in partnership with IBM. The multiyear research project, the world's largest DNA population study, uses cutting-edge genetic and computational technologies to analyze historical patterns in DNA from around the world, to better understand our shared genetic roots.

In February 2014, McKay was appointed as the 17th director/curator of the Australian Museum, succeeding Frank Howarth. She had previously served from 2012–14 as a Trustee of the museum.

Since starting in the role as Director and CEO, in April 2014, McKay has initiated a transformation program at the museum, including enshrining free general admission for children into government policy, constructing the new award-winning entrance pavilion, Crystal Hall, establishing the Australian Museum Centre for Citizen Science (part of the Australian Museum Research Institute), creating new galleries and programs, and restoring the Westpac Long Gallery, Australia's first museum gallery, which reopened in October 2017 and now houses the permanent exhibition "200 Treasures of the Australian Museum".

== Academic career ==
As of 2016 McKay was an honorary adjunct professor at the Macquarie Graduate School of Management.

== Media ==
McKay is a media commentator on practical environmental action and is a public speaker addressing business and not-for-profit conferences, as well as schools and community groups. She presented a series of on-camera "True Green Tips" for Sky News in Australia (as part of the weekly Eco Report in 2009), co-authored a weekly "True Green" column for The Sunday Telegraph (Sydney) Body and Soul section in 2007 and was named one of G Magazine's Top 20 Australian Eco Heroes in November 2009. McKay has also presented a weekly "True Green" radio spot for ABC regional radio in NSW. She was the master of ceremonies at the media conference for "Oprah's Ultimate Australian Adventure" at the Sydney Opera House, in December 2010.

== Recognition and awards ==
In 2008, McKay was awarded an Officer of the Order of Australia AO for distinguished service to the environment and the community.

In 2020, she was awarded the UTS Chancellor's Award for Excellence in 2010.

In 2011, McKay was included in the book "The Power of 100...One Hundred Women who have Shaped Australia". In 2013, McKay was named in The Australian Financial Review's 100 Women of Influence list.

Other honours and awards include:

- Fellow of the Royal Society of New South Wales, 2021
- Australian Geographic's Lifetime of Conservation Award for Excellence "for a life dedicated to the protection of Australia’s environment" – 2013
- Australian Financial Review/Westpac 100 Women of Influence Awards (Social Enterprise/Not-for-profit sector) – 2013
- Awarded AICD Board Director's women's leadership scholarship – 2013
- Inducted as a UTS “Luminary” – 2011
- Inclusion in The Power of 100...One Hundred Women Who Have Shaped Australia book for 100th Anniversary of International Women's Day — 2011
- UTS Chancellor's Award for Excellence (UTS Alumni top award) — 2010
- Co-creator, The Genographic Project for National Geographic and IBM – global DNA study focusing on population migratory history, 2005–2011
- Co-founder Clean Up the World, a project held in conjunction with the United Nations Environment Program operating in 120+ countries – 1993; Deputy Chairwoman – 1993–2009
- G Magazine top 20 Australian Eco Heroes – published 2009
- International Panel Judge for the MacArthur Foundation 100 and Change Grant, awarding US$100 million to a project that will change the world — 2017
- Appointed Fellow, Public Relations Institute of Australia (NSW) — 1997
- Winner, Environment Category, Avon Spirit of Achievement Award — 1994
- Winner, International Public Relations Association (IPRA) Golden World Award for Excellence in Environmental Communication — 1994 (presented in Uruguay)
- Member, Community Relations Committee, Sydney 2000 Olympic Bid — 1995
- United Nations Honorary Mention for Excellence in Communication for Clean Up the World — 1994 (presented at the UN, New York)
- Public Relations Institute of Australia — Golden Target Awards: Winner — Special Event (NSW) – 1998; Winner — Community Event (NSW) – 1994; Highly Commended — Program Category — 1992; Winner — Project of the Year — 1990

== Publications ==
McKay is the co-author with Jenny Bonnin of the "True Green" series of books, published in Australia by ABC Books and by National Geographic Books in the United States.

- True Green: 100 Everyday Ways You Can Contribute to a Healthier Planet (2007)
- True Green @ Work: 100 Ways You Can Make the Environment Your Business (with Tim Wallace) (2008)
- True Green Kids: 100 Things You Can Do to Save the Planet (2008)
- True Green Home: 100 Inspirational Ideas for Creating a Green Environment at Home (2009)
- True Green Life: In 100 Everyday Ways (2010)

True Green Kids won the AAAS/Subaru Book Prize for Best Hands On Science Book in 2009 and was featured in the journal Science Magazine.

== Not-for-profit roles ==
- Australian Museum Trust secretary and board member
- Australian Museum Foundation board member
- One Million Women Advisory Board
- Sydney Institute of Marine Science Foundation Board
- UNSW Sydney Science Advisory Council
- MGSM Reference Panel
- Somerville Museum Board Member
- Chief Executive Women (CEW) member
- Public Relations Institute of Australia (NSW) Fellow
- Sydney Salon co-creator and advisory board member
- Lizard Island Reef Research Foundation Board\
- Council of Australasian Museum Directors(CAMD)

McKay's previous roles have included: Clean Up Australia/World Deputy Chairwoman; Fairtrade Australia and New Zealand Board Member; RANZCO Eye Foundation Board Member; National Business Leaders Forum on Sustainable Development Steering Committee; CSIRO's ECOS Magazine Chairwoman of the Advisory Board; Center for Australian and New Zealand Studies, Georgetown University, Board Member; National Breast Cancer Foundation Marketing Advisory Committee; Sydney Olympic Games Bid Community Relations Committee; Short-handed Sailing Association of Australia Co-founder.

In 2008, she travelled to Antarctica as part of the Expedition Team, lecturing on board the Australian-based cruise ship ORION.
