= Australian Fossil and Mineral Museum =

Museum in Bathurst, Australia

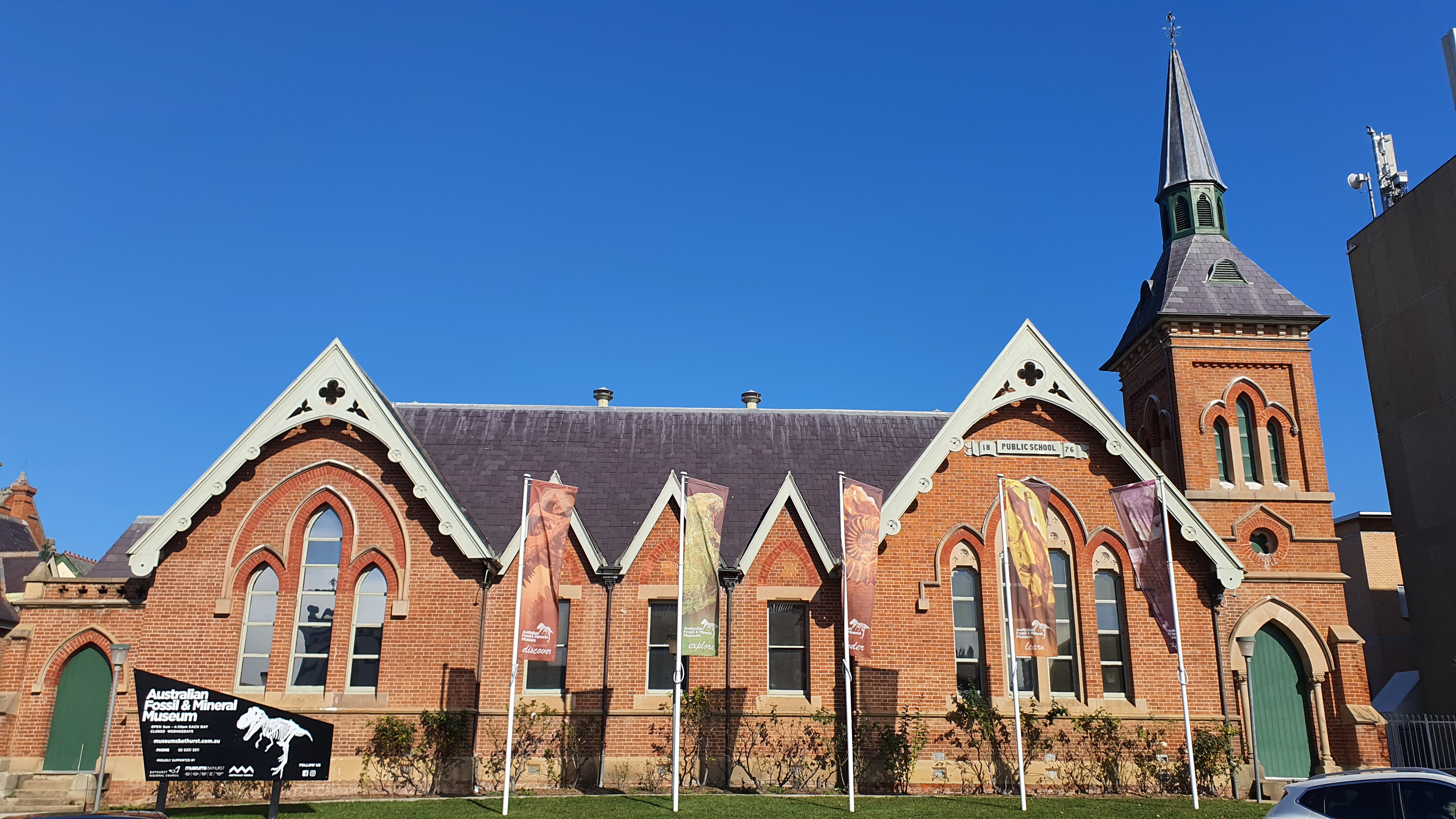
- Established: 2004
- Location: 224 Howick Street; Bathurst, New South Wales; Australia
- Coordinates: 33°25′1.15″S 149°34′50.41″E
- Type: Historical
- Website: Australian Fossil and Mineral Museum

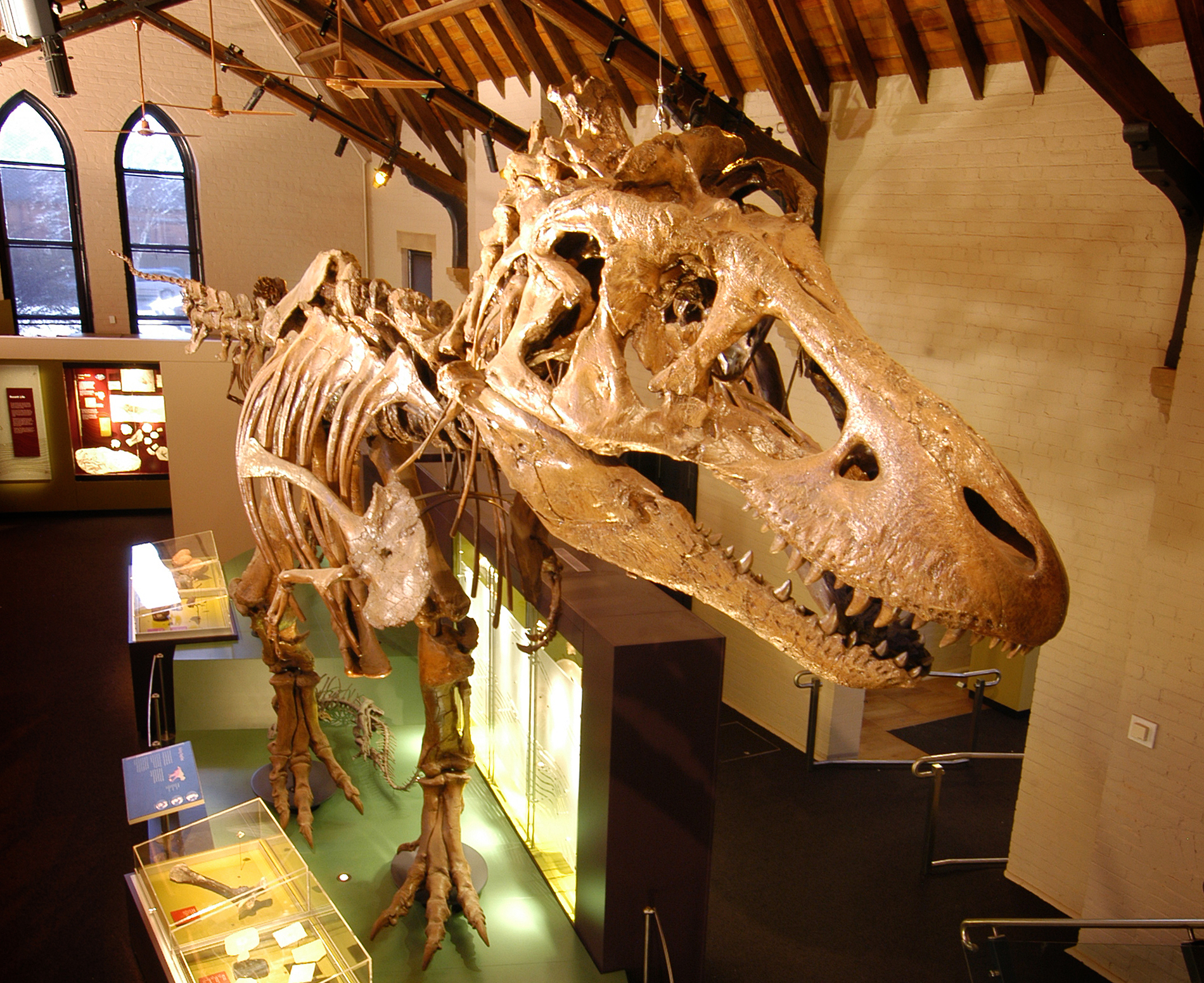
T. rex is the centrepiece of the Fossil Gallery of the Australian Fossil & Mineral Museum

The Australian Fossil and Mineral Museum - Home of the Somerville Collection is located in the city of Bathurst in regional New South Wales Australia and was opened in July 2004. The Somerville Collection, the lifetime work of Warren Somerville AM, is housed on display in the 1876 historic public school building which displays some of the finest and rarest minerals and fossils from around the world and scientifically significant fossils from Australia.

The internationally renowned collection of 5,000 specimens of both fossils and minerals are presented together to give an understanding of the Earth.

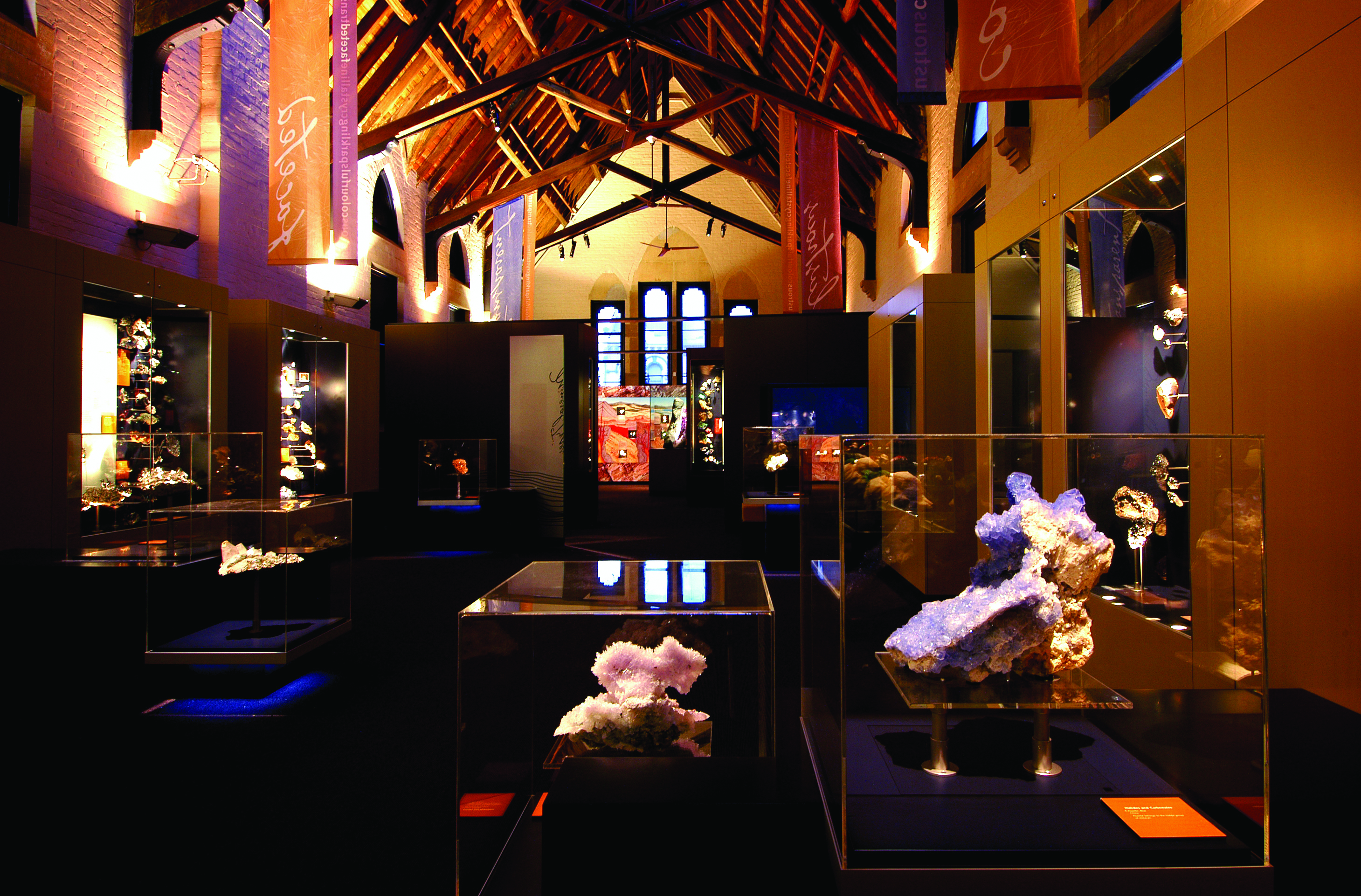
Mineral Gallery, Australian Fossil & Mineral Museum

== Exhibits ==
=== Tyrannosaurus rex ===
The centrepiece is an 11 metre long and 4-metre high Tyrannosaurus rex (T.Rex) skeleton. In addition, the Museum houses Australia's largest collection of fossils in amber, fossil dinosaur eggs, and a large collection of opalised fossils.

=== The Somerville Collection ===
The Somerville Collection is approximately one third fossil and two-thirds mineral specimens.

The Fossil Gallery includes specimens from every major stage of life on Earth. The story of life on Earth surrounds T. rex skeleton, and includes other dinosaur skeletons and fossils, a sabre tooth cat skull, Australia’s largest collection of fossils in amber, fossil dinosaur eggs, some of the oldest fossils of early forms of life, and a large collection of Australia’s unique opalised fossils.

The specimens in the Mineral Gallery of the Somerville Collection come from mine sites around the world, making them historically significant and irreplaceable heritage items.The gallery displays a large diversity of minerals and are of exceptional crystal perfection, including rare formations, crystallised gold, raw gemstones and delicate uranium.

The Museum houses the lifetime collection of Warren Somerville AM. The holder of five degrees, a part-time university lecturer for more than 20 years, a full-time teacher in the NSW TAFE for more than 25 years, and an orchardist in Orange, he has spent a lifetime building one of the world's leading private collections of minerals and fossils. Somerville has been collecting specimens from around the world for 60 years. In 2000, Warren Somerville donated this priceless legacy to the people of Australia.

== Popularity ==
The museum is a fun and educational destination for enthusiasts, families and education groups to explore the natural history of our planet.

Study fossils in amber with a magnifying glass, use the microscope to see the details of specimens and discover what’s in the drawers of the fossil and mineral cabinets.

== Funding ==
Funding to establish the Museum was provided by all three levels of government, corporate sponsorship and philanthropic donations and the continuing operation of the museum is funded by the Bathurst Regional Council. The Museum is run by Bathurst Regional Council's Museums Unit, Museums Bathurst.

Museums Bathurst is a diverse group of local Museums operated by Bathurst Regional Council, each offering very different experiences that complement a broad range of other cultural attractions that Bathurst has to offer. It includes the Australian Fossil & Mineral Museum, The Bathurst Rail Museum, the National Motor Racing Museum, Chifley Home and Education Centre and the Central Tablelands Collections Centre.
