= Litter in Australia =

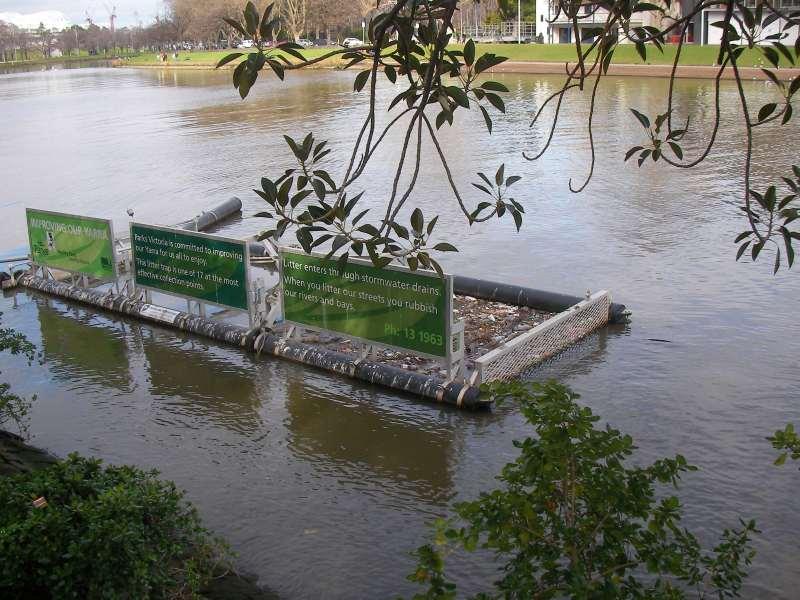
A Parks Victoria litter trap on the Yarra river catching floating rubbish in Melbourne

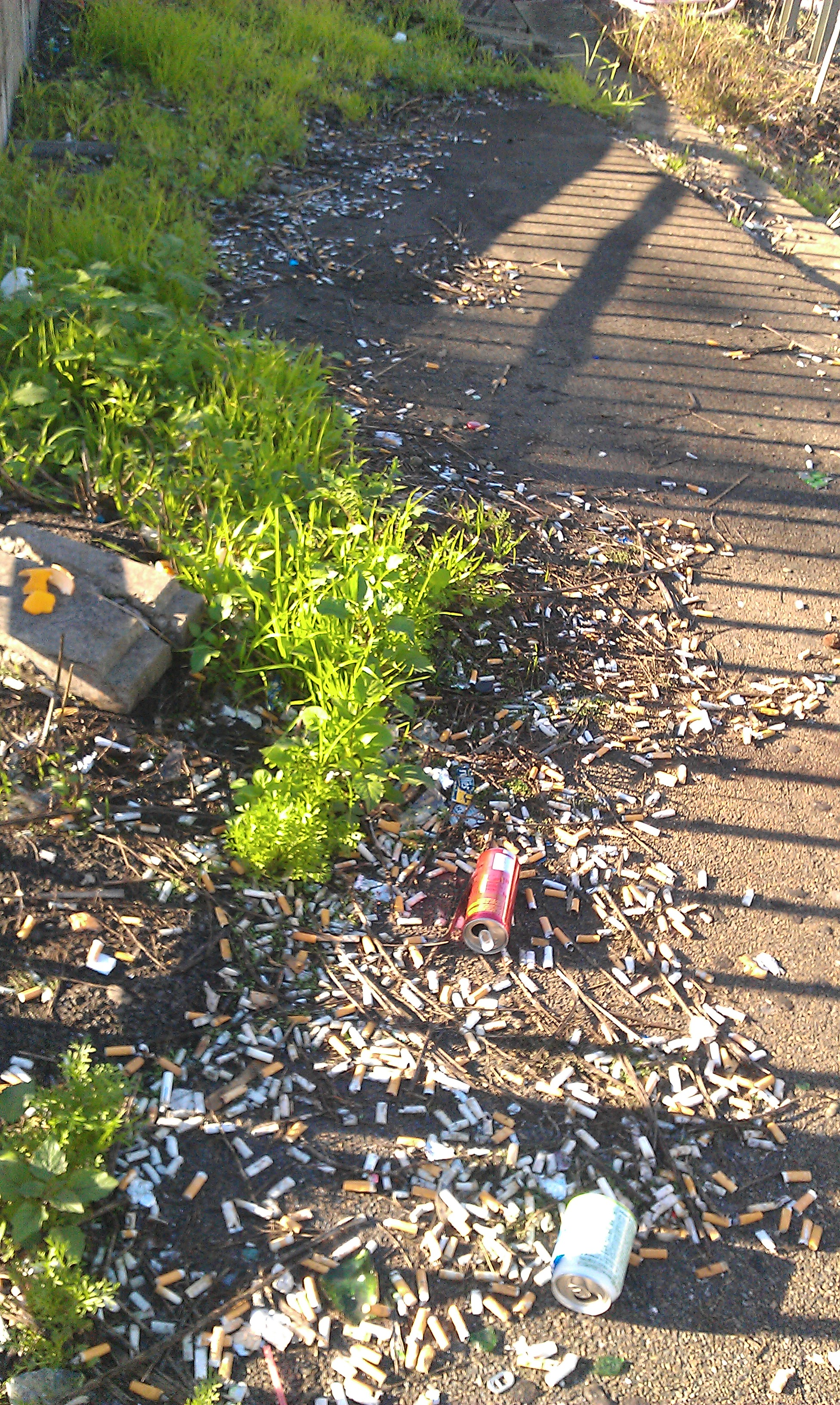
Platform of Strathfield station in Sydney, Australia

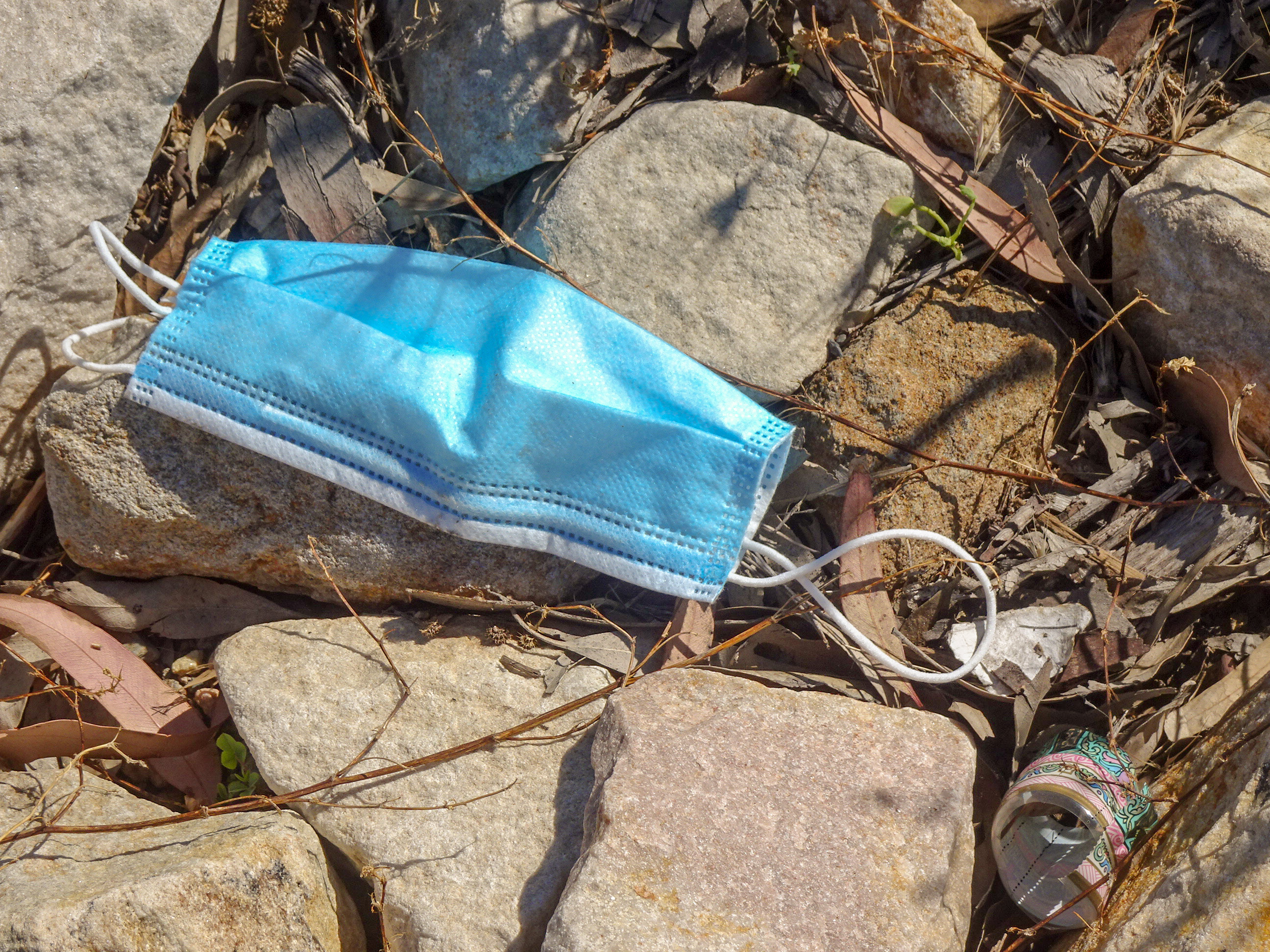
Facemask in Gladys Elphick Park, Adelaide, SA

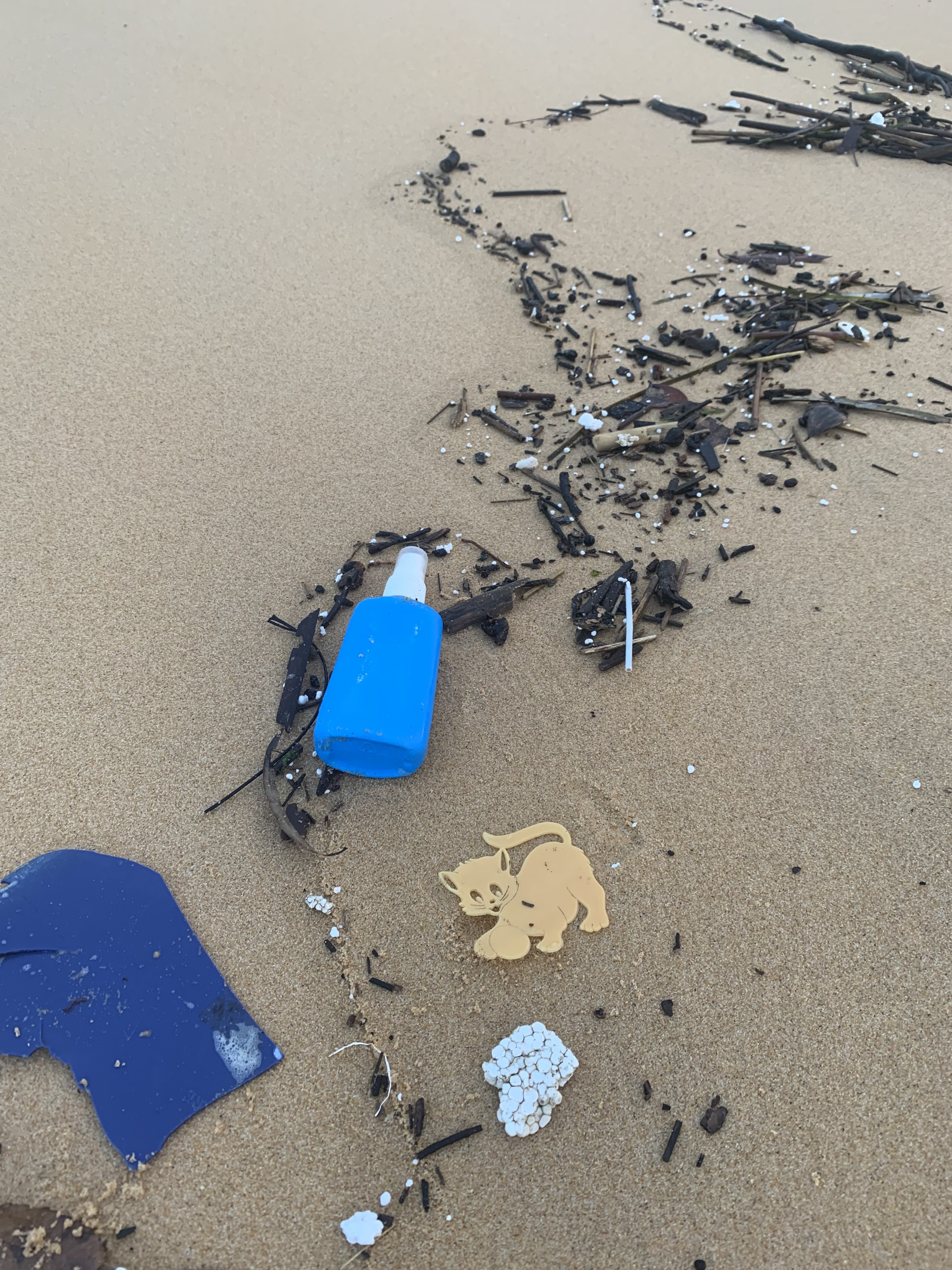
Beach litter, 2022

Litter is prevalent in many areas in Australia, and a significant environmental problem, particularly in the large cities of Sydney and Melbourne. In 2023, plastics make up 81 per cent of all surveyed litter. Litter generally describes something that has been put where it is not meant to be. It can be solid or liquid and come from domestic or commercial use.

Litter reduces the amenity of public spaces and reduces the value of the natural environment. It can choke waterways and kill marine life, block drains and cause floods as well as pose health risks. Litter can cost community, councils and state governments hundreds of thousands of dollars each year. Litter is considered the responsibility of either States and territories of Australia or Local Government Areas. All states and territories now have legislation against littering which may include fines that are enforceable by the police or other agents. In order to reduce election litter most councils give candidates up to seven days to remove campaign posters.

Littering is one of the reasons that around 130,000 tonnes of plastic end up in Australian waterways. Local efforts to reduce beach litter have been moderately successful.

== History ==
An anti-litter movement began in 1969 in Victoria with the formation of Keep Australia Beautiful. Its major anti-littering campaigns "Do the right thing" and "Tidy Towns" became well known nationally. Today, the most vocal organisation is Clean Up Australia which holds a national clean up day.

There is currently no national legislation against litter, because the federal government is not authorised by the Constitution to legislate on such a subject.

In 2006, the most commonly littered item was cigarette butts, followed by items made from paper and cardboard with plastic items a close third.

In 2015, Victoria was the state with most littering followed by Queensland.

Shopping strips were the most littered areas in 2018. Another commonly littered area is highways.

== Victoria ==
In Victoria, the first legislation included the Environment Protection Act 1970 and later the Litter Act 1987.

Litter offences are a local government issue to manage with the exception of litter from vehicles reported to EPA Victoria, and illegal dumping which also managed by EPA Victoria.

The responsibility to enforce litter laws is divided between the litter authorities including EPA Victoria, Victoria Police, local governments, VicRoads, Parks Victoria and Melbourne Water.

EPA Victoria was the first to facilitate report littering online (based on vehicle registration details) by introducing the appropriate legislation and dispense fines. EPA was also the first in Australia to create a public litter reporting service in 2002.

In 2015-16, more than 75 per cent of reports submitted to EPA Victoria by the public were about people discarding cigarette butts from their cars and 60% of offenders were male. Altona, Melbourne and Altona North were the three areas where the most littering was reported.

As of 2024, fines for littering can go up to $769 for individuals and $3846 for corporations.

The Independent Inquiry into the EPA report commissioned by the Minister for Environment, Climate Change and Water that was delivered in 2016 found that litter fine revenue accounted for "just under five per cent of the EPA’s operating budget". The report recommended that the EPA no longer retain revenue from litter fines as retaining revenue is a "clear conflict of interest and aligns poorly with the EPA’s mission. The availability of these receipts may distort the regulator’s incentives and encourage it to dedicate a disproportionate share of its limited resources to a relatively minor environmental hazard."

== Northern Territory ==
Northern Territory followed Victoria and adopted the Litter Act (1972).

== South Australia ==
In South Australia the Container Deposit Legislation (1977) was introduced with the aim of reducing litter by encouraging recycling and remains the only state in Australia with this type of legislation.

== Western Australia ==
Anti-litter legislation was introduced to Western Australia through the Litter Act (1979).

== Australian Capital Territory ==
Litter legislation was introduced to the Australian Capital Territory with the Litter Regulations (1993).

== Queensland ==
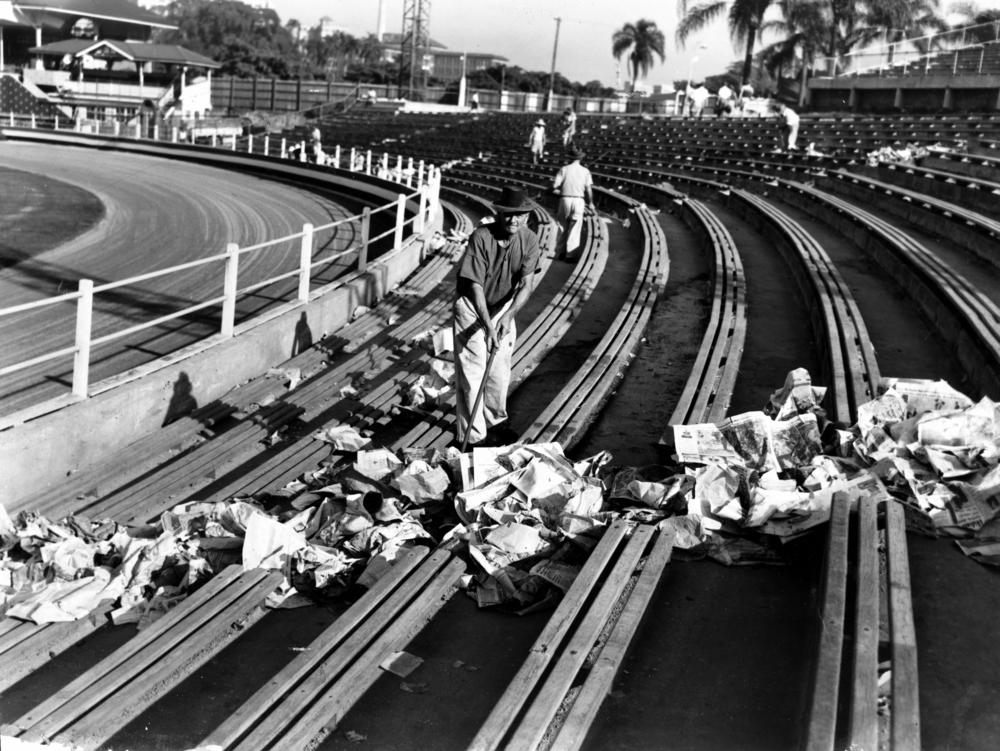
Cleaning up litter after a visit by Queen Elizabeth II in Brisbane, 1954

In Queensland, litter laws first came into place through the Environmental Protection Act (1994). The Waste Reduction and Recycling Act 2011 provides provisions to manage litter and illegal dumping across the state. It stipulates that dangerous littering is litter that causes or is likely to cause harm to a person, property or the environment. It facilitates the reporting of illegal dumping by members of the public.

== New South Wales ==
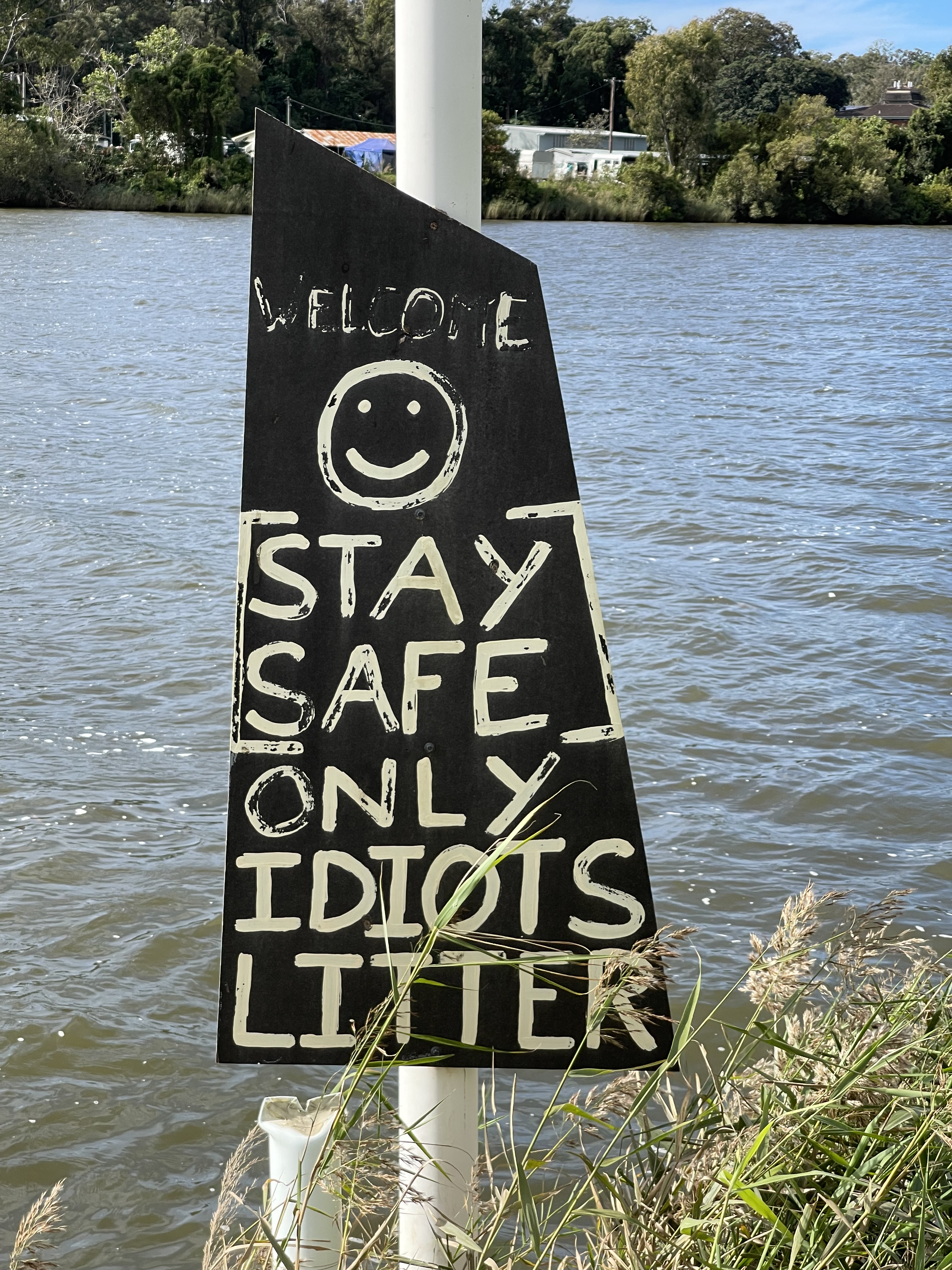
Anti litter sign in Woodford Island, NSW, June 2021

In New South Wales, legislation was introduced through the Protection of the Environment Operations Act 1997.

== Tasmania ==
In Tasmania, anti-litter legislation was introduced through the Litter Act (2007).

== See also ==
- Environmental issues in Australia
- Container deposit legislation in Australia (container deposit legislation is an effective measure for reducing litter)
- Waste management in Australia
- Plastic bag bans in Australia
