= LMSC =

LMSC can be an abbreviation for:

- LAN/MAN Standards Committee, the body which defined IEEE 802
- Licensed Marine Store Collector, once an Australian dealer in recyclable goods - see Container deposit legislation in Australia
- Lockheed Missiles and Space Company a large US business
- Port Lincoln Marine Science Centre, a South Australian research and teaching establishment
- Local Media Services Company, a West Australian television broadcast production company
