= Plastic bag bans in Australia =

Plastic bag bans in Australia were implemented in the early 21st century by the country’s states and territories, rather than through federal law. The intent of the bans is to help reduce the amount of plastic pollution in the environment, both in and around Australia and globally.

In 2003, the Tasmanian town of Coles Bay was the first location in Australia to ban plastic bags. Although in 2008 Environment Minister Peter Garrett announced the Rudd government's goal of a nationwide plastic bag ban by year's end, he later abandoned the initiative due to cost of living concerns and disagreement about the policy among state and territory governments. This led to states and territories pursuing their own approaches.

The introduction of the Zero Waste program in South Australia led to the first statewide lightweight bag ban being introduced in October 2008. It is estimated that this move has saved 400 million bags annually. Victoria implemented their lightweight bag ban in November 2019. New South Wales was the last jurisdiction in Australia that implemented a lightweight bag ban effective from 1 June 2022.

Since 2018, the country's two largest supermarket chains, Coles and Woolworths, voluntarily removed free lightweight plastic bags from their stores and began charging for thicker reusable plastic bags instead. The reusable bags were sold at 15 cents in both chains. By December 2018, the supermarket phase-out led to an estimated 80% drop in the use of plastic bags nationwide, leading to 1.5 billion fewer bags entering the environment.

== Background ==
In Australia, 6 billion HDPE bags were used in 2002. Usage reduced to 5.6 billion in 2004 and 3.9 billion in 2007. According to Keep Australia Beautiful's 2015–16 National Litter Index, plastic bags made up 1% of the country's litter. In 2016 environmental groups expressed their concern that Australia was lagging other countries in the phase-out of lightweight plastic bags, including Botswana, Somalia and Tanzania. In 2016 it was estimated that of the 5 billion plastic bags used annually by Australians, 150 million ended up as litter.

In April 2017, The Project and Clean Up Australia launched a Change.org petition for the premiers of the three states without plastic bag bans – Victoria, New South Wales and Western Australia – to "ban the bag". After a segment on The Project about the petition, #BanTheBag became the top trending topic on Twitter. In February 2018, a motion was put in the Australian Federal Parliament calling for a nationwide ban of lightweight non-biodegradable plastic shopping bags. Senate inquiries into recycling and marine plastic pollution also led to tripartisan recommendations by the Liberal, Labor and Greens parties to ban all single-use plastics in the country by 2023 and for all states and territories to ban plastic bags.

== Plastic bag bans by state/territory ==
=== Summary ===
Jurisdiction	Lightweight plastic bags banned?	Commencement date
South Australia	Yes	4 May 2009
Northern Territory	Yes	1 September 2011
Australian Capital Territory	Yes	1 November 2011
Tasmania	Yes	1 November 2013
Queensland	Yes	1 July 2018
Western Australia	Yes	1 July 2018
Victoria	Yes	1 November 2019
New South Wales	Yes	1 June 2022

=== South Australia ===
The Plastic Shopping Bags (Waste Avoidance) Bill passed the Parliament of South Australia on 13 November 2008, with a transitional period of 1 January to 4 May 2009. With an official start date of 4 May 2009, South Australia was the first state or territory in Australia to ban plastic bags at the checkout, with retailers facing fines of up to $5,000 for distributing banned bags and retailer suppliers fined up to $20,000. The ban does not extend to heavier plastic bags or fruit and vegetable bags.

=== Northern Territory ===
The Northern Territory banned plastic bags with effect from 1 September 2011. Biodegradable and heavier bags remain legal.

=== Australian Capital Territory ===
The ACT was the third jurisdiction after The Northern Territory to pass a law banning plastic bags, with the ban entering into effect on 1 November 2011. Plastic barrier bags for fruit and vegetables are exempt.

=== Tasmania ===
In 2003 Coles Bay was the first Australian town to completely ban non-biodegradable plastic bags. In November 2010 a Greens motion introduced to Tasmania's parliament to ban plastic bags received tripartisan support from Labor, the Liberals and the Greens. A statewide ban began on 1 November 2013. A 2015 review found widespread support for the ban but a mixed environmental impact.

=== Queensland ===
In November 2016 the Queensland Government announced it would ban plastic bags from 2018, after the Opposition promised that it would implement a ban if it won the next state election. The implementing legislation passed the Queensland Parliament on 6 September 2017, accompanied by a container refund recycling scheme. Both initiatives took effect on 1 July 2018.

=== Western Australia ===
Two attempts by the City of Fremantle in 2013 and 2015 to introduce a citywide plastic bag ban were blocked through disallowance motions moved in the Western Australian Legislative Council. In September 2017, the Western Australian Government announced it would commence a statewide plastic bag ban on 1 July 2018. As of 1 July 2022, any type of plastic bag is now banned.

=== Victoria ===
In mid-2017, Victoria's state government expressed its preference for a national ban, while confirming it would be open to a state-level ban in the future. In October 2017, Daniel Andrews stated that Victoria would introduce a ban on plastic bags, with the start date to be announced in early 2018 after consultation with industry and the community. The Government subsequently announced the plastic bag ban would commence by 1 November 2019.

=== New South Wales ===
In 2017, Premier Gladys Berejiklian stated that no regulation was needed because retailers responsible for 80% of plastic bags in the state (Coles, Woolworths, and Harris Farm) would voluntarily stop providing free plastic bags themselves. In October 2019, the Berejiklian Government blocked a Labor Party bill that would ban plastic bags, arguing that its plastic waste reduction discussion paper should be released first. The discussion paper was released in March 2020, and included a proposed plastic bag ban, which was likely to come into effect in 2021 following community consultation.

In November 2021, a bill passed into law to explicitly legally ban single-use plastics throughout NSW. The law went into legal effect on 1 June 2022.

== Retailer positions ==
Aldi has never offered free plastic bags to customers since opening its first Australian store in 2001. Customers are charged 15 cents for a thick plastic bag and more for fabric or cooler bags. In 2009 Target announced it would stop giving out free bags in its stores, instead charging 10 cents per bag. In 2013 Target again began providing free bags, stating that it had received about 500 formal customer complaints per year about the lack of free bags. In 2019 Target and its sister chain Kmart withdrew single use plastic bags nationwide. Bunnings has charged 10 cents for plastic bags since 2003, while IKEA stopped offering free bags in 2013.

In 2017 the country's largest supermarket chains, Woolworths and Coles, announced that they would stop providing free plastic bags to customers nationwide in 2018, and would sell thicker plastic bags for 15 cents each. Withdrawing free bags is expected to save the retailers $170 million per year in reduced packaging costs while creating a revenue stream from selling thicker plastic bags.

The move was criticised by conservative commentators including Andrew Bolt and Steve Price. The loss of free bags also sparked backlash from some consumers, with several stealing shopping baskets or trolleys in protest and reports of abuse or assault towards staff. Criticisms include the continued overuse of plastic by retailers, poor quality of the replacement bags and allegations that the true motive was profiteering. Marketing academics described the backlash as caused by the retailers breaking the perceived "psychological contract" with consumers to either provide free plastic bags or otherwise remove plastic throughout the store for environmental benefit, rather than merely charging for something that had previously been provided without additional charge.

In response to customer backlash Coles reversed its position, offering to provide reusable plastic bags for free indefinitely in most states. This led to criticism from Greenpeace, Craig Reucassel and other environmentalists, causing Coles to reverse its reversal and announce it would again charge for bags from 29 August 2018 onwards. Woolworths also extended the timeframe for providing free plastic bags, until 8 July 2018. By December 2018, the National Retail Association estimated that plastic bag consumption fell by 80% nationwide as a result of the major supermarket withdrawal of free bags, leading to 1.5 billion fewer bags entering the environment.

Harris Farms ceased providing free plastic bags in January 2018, instead offering free reusable paper bags or recycled boxes to consumers. Craveable Brands also moved to phase out single-use plastic bags in its Oporto, Red Rooster and Chicken Treat chains by July 2018.

In April 2023, Woolworths announced the phasing out of 15 cent reusable plastic bags, which was followed suit by Coles in May.

== Alternatives to plastic bags ==
A side-effect of the plastic bag ban observed in South Australia was the increased use of bin liners, which have a greater environmental impact than plastic bags as they do not break down well in modern landfills. Environmentally-friendly alternatives suggested instead of bin liners include composting food scraps and using free community newspapers as liners instead.

A 2007 report into shopping bag alternatives noted that paper bags were less environmentally friendly than plastic bags due to a higher carbon footprint. Similarly, cotton bags were unsuitable due to the pesticides used and high volume of water needed to create them. The "greenest" option was using recycled plastic bags.

Concern has been expressed about potential unintended adverse health outcomes associated with the plastic bag ban rollout due to the lack of care by consumers in maintaining alternative shopping bags in a clean and healthy condition. Overseas experiences in locations such as San Francisco, where increased illness and even deaths were reported in the aftermath of similar bans to those in Australian states, suggest that this is a real concern.

== See also ==
- Plastic bag bans
- Container deposit schemes in Australia
