= Planet Ark =

Australian environmental organisation

- Planet Ark Environmental Foundation
- Formation: 1992
- Founder: Paul Klymenko; Peter Shenstone; Jon Dee
- Type: Not-for-profit
- Legal status: Charity
- Headquarters: Sydney, Australia
- Region served: Australia
- Website: planetark.org
- Formerly called: Ark Australia

Planet Ark Environmental Foundation is an Australian non-profit environmental organisation founded in 1992. Planet Ark aims to partner with organisations in the public and private sectors to help find ways to reduce impact on planet Earth. The focus areas are the environmental impacts of human consumption in the home, the workplace, and the community. Planet Ark's campaigns include 'Cartridges 4 Planet Ark', Australia's 'National Recycling Week', and the country's biggest annual community tree planting event, National Tree Day. The organisation operates from its office in Sydney.

== History ==
Ark Australia was founded in 1992 by Paul Klymenko, Peter Shenstone, and former Ark UK member Jon Dee. At the time, curbside recycling was in its infancy, and environmental information was very limited. The organisation was commissioned to create 300 "Save the Planet" videos involving high-profile celebrities and soon became known as Planet Ark. Several major events are organised by Planet Ark, including National Tree Day, founded in 1996 with Olivia Newton-John; National Recycling Week; and the Schools Recycle Right Challenge. The organisation began many high-profile campaigns that have since either moved to other providers or become staples of the public recycling sphere, including 'Cards 4 Planet Ark', 'Phones for Planet Ark', Steel Can and Aluminum Can (Al Cans) recycling. To demonstrate that cleaning products could be as effective without a heavy chemical composition, Planet Ark released the Aware Laundry Powder range in 1994. This was soon followed by 100% recycled toilet tissue.

In May 2025, it was placed in voluntary administration which it exited in June 2025, and has successfully returned to standard management.

== Campaigns ==
Planet Ark's campaigns seek to promote positive action that directly changes people's behaviour. The organisation intends to be non-political and non-confrontational, aiming to unite people and business in action. Planet Ark's main objectives are to promote sustainable resource use, encourage low carbon lifestyles, and connect people with nature. Planet Ark works with businesses and endorses a number of commercial products it considers to be environmentally friendly in production and manufacture, including recycled toilet paper, cleaning products, and car tires.

Planet Ark's campaigns include:

- National Tree Day is Australia's largest tree-planting and nature care event. Since 1996, over 29 million trees, shrubs and grasses have been planted by over 5 million volunteers, and over 720,000 School Tree Day events have taken place. National Tree Day and Schools Tree Day are held in July every year. Tropical Tree Day, held in December, was officially added in 2014 to cater for the northern regions of Australia. In 2025, 11,550 seedlings had been planted for Tropical Tree Day.
- National Recycling Week is the annual opportunity for Australian schools, workplaces, councils, and public to focus on the benefits and how-to's of responsible waste management. Since its inception in 1996, the campaign has shifted from just recycling to awareness and education about the waste hierarchy and more recently, the circular economy and how Australians can play a role. Schools can take part in the Schools Recycle Right campaign across Term 4 to allow for more flexibility in teaching schedules.
- Cartridges 4 Planet Ark is a partnership between Planet Ark, the recycling centre Close the Loop and four of the largest cartridge manufacturers – Brother, Canon, Epson and HP. In 2026 the program hit 60 million cartridges diverted from landfill with zero waste to landfill.
- BusinessRecycling.com.au is designed to make recycling at work easy. The site lists recycling services for more than 90 different materials ranging from aluminum can to fly ash and from packaging to batteries. The site is made possible through support of the NSW EPA. In 2025, this was merged with RecyclingNearYou.
- RecyclingNearYou.com.au is a comprehensive directory of the recycling services offered by more than 500 councils around Australia, industry and product stewardship recycling schemes available across the country. Each year millions of enquiries are made to the site covering items that can go in their home recycling to those items that must be recycled through dedicated schemes.
- Make it Australian Recycled was launched in partnership with Australian Paper to promote the practice of purchasing consumer goods made from recycled materials to Australians.
- Make it Wood is designed to encourage individuals and businesses to use responsibility sourced wood as a building material.
- The Australasian Recycling Label was developed by Planet Ark and Green Chip with the Australian Packaging Covenant Organisation to create a standardised labeling system to allow consumers to make better decisions about packaging recyclability.

== Celebrity supporters ==
Celebrities who have fronted Planet Ark campaigns include Pierce Brosnan, Kamahl, Olivia Newton-John, Jamie Durie, Steve Irwin, Kylie Minogue, Dannii Minogue, Nicole Kidman, Tom Cruise, Shelley Craft, Richard Branson, TV personalities Tim Webster, James Treble, Ranger Stacey, Peter Maddison, and Surfer Layne Beachley.

Current ambassadors include ABC's Gardening Australia host Costa Georgiadis, author Anita Van Dyke, Dr. Amanda Lloyd, Magdalena Roze, and children's sensation dirtgirlworld.

Planet Ark's official spokesperson is environmentalist Rebecca Gilling.

== Criticism ==
Planet Ark's carbon capture and sustainable building materials campaign 'Make it Wood' was criticised by Jon Dee and Pat Cash who appeared on television to complain about the links to the timber industry and involvement in drafting the Australian Forestry Standard. which Nick Xenophon has said "raises some serious questions of a potential conflict of interest" and caused Christine Milne to criticise the organisation. Planet Ark responded to the enquiries in a letter explaining its position in detail. The Australian Forestry Standard is an attempt to create an Australian specific standard, as opposed to the international Forest Stewardship Council and Planet Ark recommends choosing FSC wood products.

== See also ==
- Conservation movement
- Environmental movement
- Waste management in Australia
