= Environment Protection Authority (South Australia) =

Environmental regulator of South Australia, Australia

Environment Protection Authority South Australia
Agency overview
- Formed: 1 May 1995
- Jurisdiction: Government of South Australia
- Headquarters: 211 Victoria Square, Adelaide, South Australia
- Minister responsible: Lucy Hood, Minister for Climate, Environment and Water
- Agency executives: Catherine Cooper, Presiding Member; Jon Gorvett, Chief Executive
- Website: www.epa.sa.gov.au

The Environment Protection Authority South Australia (EPA) is South Australia's environmental regulator. The EPA is an independent statutory authority, established in 1995 under the Environment Protection Act 1993 (EP Act). The EPA's role is to prevent and reduce the harmful effects of pollution and waste on South Australians and their environment.
