= Container deposit schemes in Australia =

A container deposit scheme (CDS), also known as container deposit legislation (CDL), is a scheme that refunds consumers for returning empty beverage containers for recycling. A scheme was first implemented in South Australia in 1977 and taken up by the Northern Territory in 2012, New South Wales in 2017, the Australian Capital Territory in June 2018, Queensland in November 2018, Western Australia in October 2020, Victoria in November 2023 and Tasmania in May 2025.

A 2012 Newspoll survey found a majority of people in Australia support a deposit scheme, and a national scheme has also been proposed many times over the years. The NSW scheme had been strongly opposed by the beverage industry before its introduction.

The value of deposits and the scope of their application have been influenced by the Australian federal constitution's guarantee of free trade between the states. The defining case in this issue was the attempt to introduce a differential between reusable and recyclable bottle deposits. The issue was taken to the High Court of Australia in the Castlemaine Tooheys Ltd v South Australia court case. State-based schemes need to be exempted from the Commonwealth Mutual Recognition Act which guarantees products can be sold in any jurisdiction without requiring any special labelling. This formed the basis of legal action against the Northern Territory's scheme until an exemption was granted. The value of a container deposit is 10 cents for an eligible container.

== Historical ==
Through the early 20th century, when the cost of producing glass bottles was higher, a natural industry of glass bottle collectors and merchants performed a similar function to the modern CDS. Bottle accumulators, a licensed and unionized workforce commonly known as "bottle-ohs" from their street cries, travelled by cart around the streets buying empty bottles from households and businesses. They would then sell the bottles to a bottle yard, which would store and sort the bottles before selling them in bulk to brewers and other bottlers. It was an industry from which a bottle-oh could make a good living; in 1904, they could buy a dozen beer bottles for 6d., sell them to the bottle yard for 9d., who could sell them to brewers for 1s.

Soft drink and other beverage bottles were still collected in Queensland and returned for deposits up to the late 1960s. In Western Australia soft drink bottles could be exchanged for 10 cents and beer bottles for 2 cents until around 1982.

== Schemes by state and territory ==
=== Summary ===
Jurisdiction	Name	Commencement date
South Australia	South Australian CDS	1 January 1977
Northern Territory	NT CDS	3 January 2012
New South Wales	Return and Earn	1 December 2017
Australian Capital Territory	ACT CDS	30 June 2018
Queensland	Containers for Change	1 November 2018
Western Australia	Containers for Change	1 October 2020
Victoria	CDS Vic	1 November 2023
Tasmania	Recycle Rewards	1 May 2025

=== South Australia ===
CDL in South Australia was put in place under the Beverage Container Act 1975 (SA) and came into operation in 1977. Environment Protection Act 1993 (SA) now governs the levying and refund of deposits.

There is a refund of 10 cents per can or bottle (raised from 5 cents in late 2008). In the 1970s, deposits ranged from 20c for a 30oz bottle and 10c for a 10oz and 6½oz bottle. With the introduction of plastic and non-reusable bottles, the deposit was reduced to 5c (including aluminium cans). This amount remained unchanged till late 2008.

Around 600 people are employed in the recovery of bottles in South Australia with community groups such as the Scouts to operate container refund depots. While there are professional collectors who collect on an arranged basis from particular venues (e.g. pubs and restaurants), usually operating small trucks for the job, there are also many socially marginalised collectors who forage in spots such as refuse bins for discarded deposit bottles; these collectors often travel by bicycle, sometimes with relatively elaborate and inventive modifications to allow them to carry bulky loads of bottles.

Until 2008, every beverage container in Australia bore the words "5c refund at SA collection depots in state of purchase". This changed to "10c refund at SA collection depots in state of purchase" in late 2008. Since the Northern Territory started their own scheme in 2012, this message has changed again. With other jurisdictions implementing their own schemes a common label has been developed. The new label reads: "10c refund at collection depots/points in participating State/Territory of purchase".

In September 2025, the South Australian Government announced the expansion of the deposit container scheme to include wine and spirit bottles by the end of 2027.

=== Northern Territory ===
The Northern Territory introduced a container deposit scheme similar to South Australia's from 3 January 2012. The introduction was challenged in the Federal Court by Coca-Cola Amatil, Schweppes Australia and Lion Pty Ltd using the Commonwealth Mutual Recognition Act and the scheme ceased on 4 March 2013. Immediately after the Federal Court loss, the NT government personally stepped in to keep the scheme going until a permanent exemption to the Mutual Recognition Act could be secured. On 7 August 2013 the Federal Executive Council (ExCo) ratified the permanent exemption making the NT container deposit scheme completely legal and permanent.

Due to this, soft drink containers sold in Australia bore the words "10c refund at SA/NT collection depots in state/territory of purchase". With other jurisdictions implementing their own schemes a common label was developed: "10c refund at collection depots/points in participating State/Territory of purchase"

=== New South Wales ===
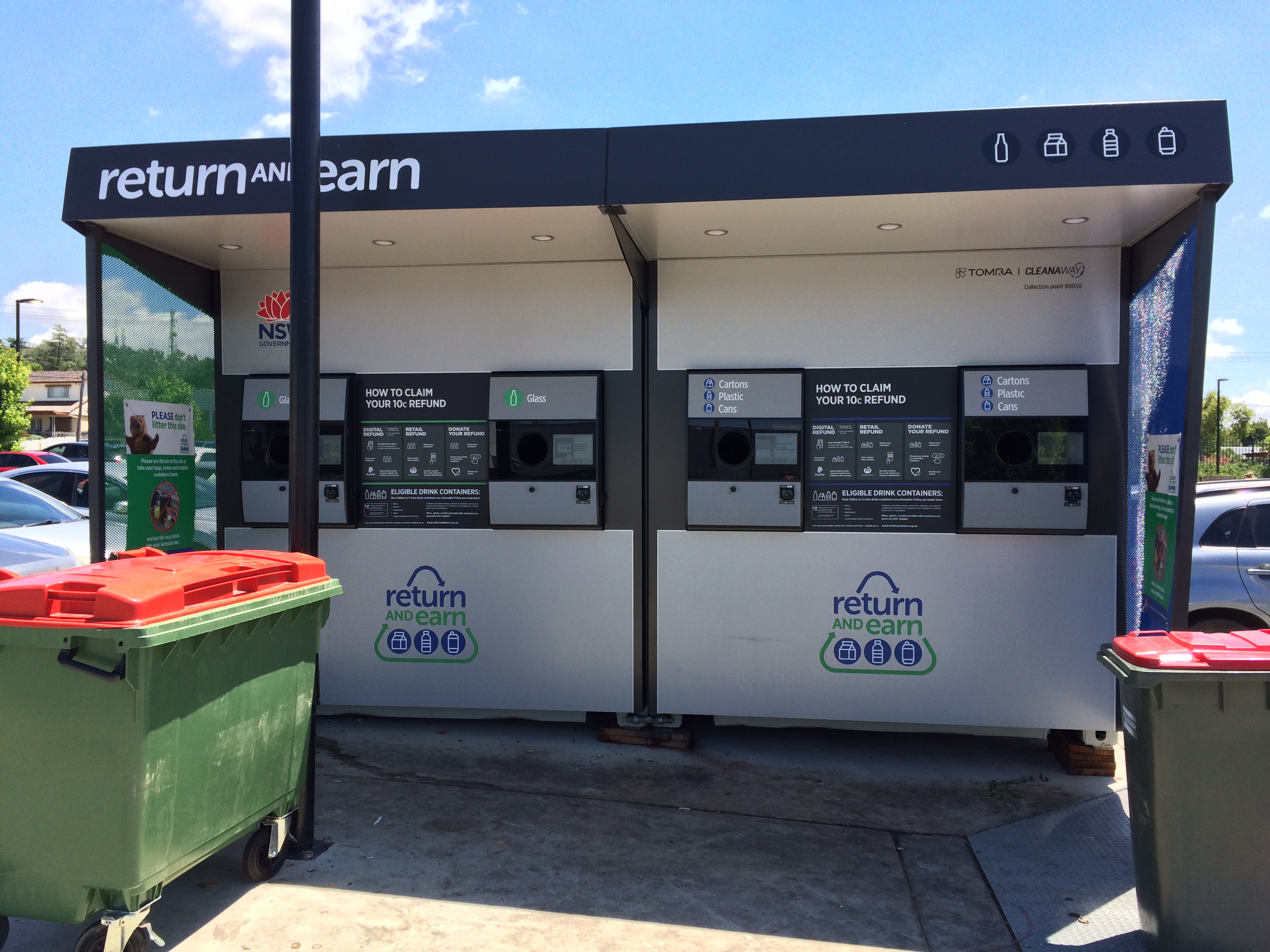
A Return and Earn reverse vending machine, December 2017.

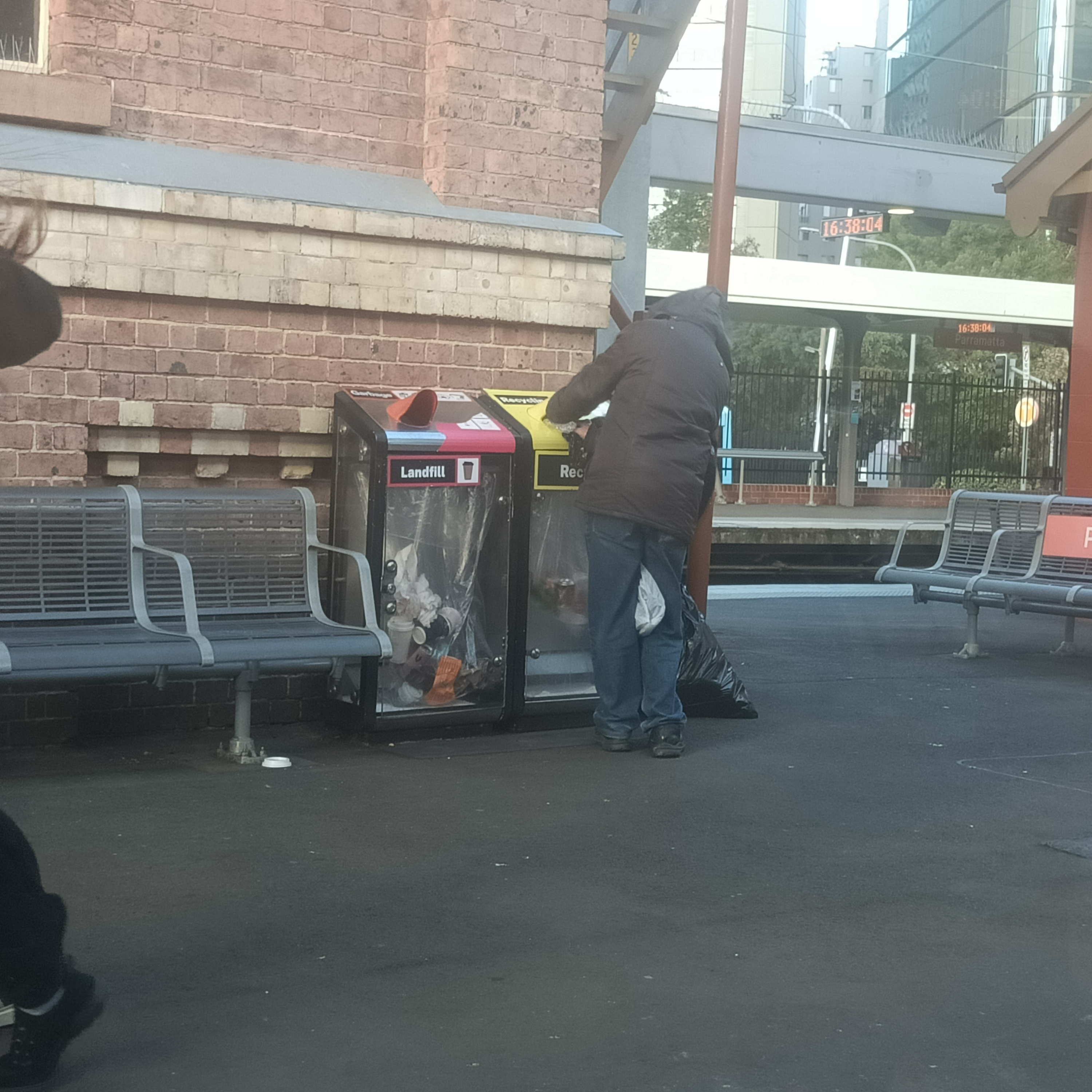
A person collecting recycling containers for use in a container deposit scheme. Sydney, Australia. 2025

In the 1960s and 1970s Sydney had a bottle return scheme whereby retailers returned bottles to the manufacturer for refunds. If the retailer supported it, members of the general public could return bottles to the point of sale for refunds.

In the 2000s the New South Wales government indicated it wished to push ahead with a container deposit scheme as part of a raft of new policies aimed at protecting the environment and preventing litter. The scheme has strong backing from the public, various politicians, NSW councils, and various environmental groups such as Clean Up Australia, Boomerang Alliance, and Total Environment Centre. At the time the proposal was opposed by major beverage manufacturers, which mounted a sustained but ultimately unsuccessful lobbying campaign.

On 8 May 2016 the government announced a ten-cent container deposit scheme for packaged drinks between 150 ml and three litres. Wine bottles and milk cartons were excluded, as were beverages packaged in paper or cardboard. The scheme was initially proposed to begin in July 2017 but was delayed until December 2017 following requests from environment groups and industry bodies. In July 2017 the NSW Environment Protection Agency announced the scheme coordinator would be a joint venture called Exchange for Change, comprising major beverage manufacturers Asahi, Carlton & United Breweries, Coca-Cola Amatil, Coopers Brewery and Lion. The announcement was opposed by the NSW Greens party, as some of the manufacturers had not previously supported container deposit schemes.

Initial implementation of the scheme – named "Return and Earn" – generated substantial returns of containers along with some community criticism for increasing drink prices, litter around container collection centres and insufficient return points in regional areas. By January 2026, 15 billion containers had been returned via the scheme, $1.5 billion have been returned to New South Wales residents, and $91.5 million donated to charity. There are 650 return points across NSW.

In September 2025, the New South Wales Government announced its intention to include wine and spirit bottles into its container deposit scheme. According to New South Wales Environment Minister Penny Sharpe, the NSW Government is "working with industry to ensure a smooth transition and to ensure return systems will be ready to handle the new containers by mid-2027".

=== Australian Capital Territory ===
The ACT Container Deposit Scheme legislation was passed into law on 9 November 2017 and a public consultation period was conducted ahead of the scheme's implementation in 2018. The scheme began on 30 June 2018 and operates under the "Return and Earn" scheme in neighbouring New South Wales.

=== Queensland ===
An opinion poll in 2013 indicated public support for a Queensland container deposit scheme. Despite this, it was opposed by the Newman government on the grounds that it might increase the cost of living. In February 2015 the newly elected Palaszczuk government gave in-principle support for the scheme and established a public consultation process on structure and operations. On 22 July 2016 the government announced the introduction of a Container Deposit Scheme "to get drink cans and bottles off our beaches, and out of our parks and public areas". Legislation implementing the scheme was introduced in 2017 along with a statewide plastic bag ban.

Queensland's container refund scheme, known as "Containers for Change", began on 1 November 2018. The scheme is administered by the non-profit company COEX, with collection points operated by Envirobank or TOMRA. The Queensland Productivity Commission was commissioned to review the scheme's impact on prices, with submissions closing on 12 June 2019 and a draft report due on 1 August 2019.

=== Western Australia ===
In 2011, opposition Labor and Greens MPs called for the introduction of a container deposit scheme. The Minister for Environment, Bill Marmion, said that WA would wait for a national "consultation regulatory impact statement" to be completed at the end of 2011 before taking any action.

In August 2016, the WA Government announced a state container deposit scheme commencing in 2018. Minister for the Environment Albert Jacob said that efforts to pursue a national scheme had "fallen by the wayside" but that Western Australia's policy should be aligned with recent changes in Queensland and New South Wales. After a change of government at the March 2017 election, the new Environment Minister Stephen Dawson said he wanted to make a container deposit scheme a priority. In August 2017 the new WA Government held public consultation, and it will start a container deposit scheme in 2020 in a bid to lift the State's low recycling rates. The scheme launched under the banner "Containers for Change" on 1 October 2020.

The addition of containers for wines, spirits, concentrated fruit and vegetable juices, flavoured milk, cordial and water in casks to the scheme is scheduled for 1 July 2026.

=== Victoria ===
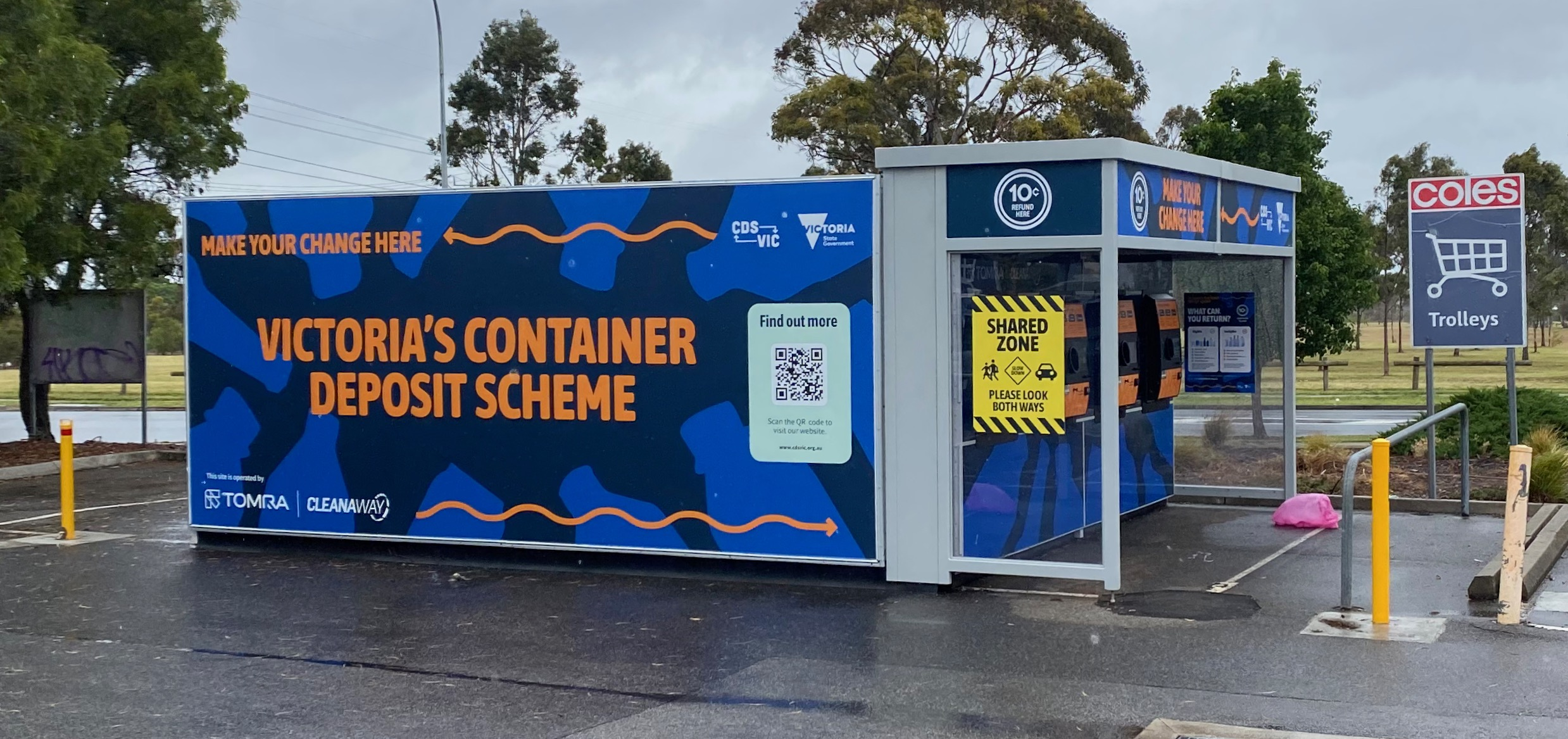
Reverse vending machine in western Melbourne

The state of Victoria once had a container deposit scheme in the 1980s called "Cash for Cans" but was rescinded in 1989.

In 2009 the Victorian Greens introduced a bill for a 10c deposit scheme, which was passed in the upper house but the government quashed the bill in the lower house, allegedly on constitutional grounds, by refusing to allow it to be debated. Despite supporting the Greens' bill when in opposition, when it later became the government the Coalition decided it would not back a bottle refund scheme. Instead, it said it would support a national scheme if one were created.

In 2012/2013, the Napthine government indicated its strong support for a state-based scheme possibly in partnership with NSW.

In February 2015, then Environment Minister, Lisa Neville, under the Andrews government, had publicly said she was not in favour of a container deposit scheme for Victoria. She believed the recycling programs at that time were good enough, even though Cleanup Australia claimed beverage-related rubbish in Victoria outnumbered cigarette-related rubbish.

In July 2017 her successor Lily D'Ambrosio confirmed the state's continuing opposition to a state scheme on the basis that the costs would outweigh the environmental benefits.

In February 2020, as part of a recycling policy overhaul, D'Ambrosio announced that the state would introduce a container deposit scheme which commenced on 1 November 2023, after consulting with industry and local government.

=== Tasmania ===
In December 2014 a state-based deposit scheme was rejected by the government, citing costs and the need to ship containers to the Australian mainland for processing. Various environmental organisations, including The Greens and many Tasmanian local councils have been pushing for a scheme in Tasmania for many years. Most people are in favour of a scheme according to various studies that have been conducted over the years.

In June 2019 the Tasmanian government announced the goal of introducing a refund scheme by 2022. After several delays, the scheme, named Recycle Rewards, was launched on 1 May 2025.

== Impact ==
From its launch in December 2017 up to June 2025, the New South Wales scheme had collected more than 13 billion containers and 1.1 million tonnes of material had been recycled. In Western Australia, 4.5 billion containers had been returned, as of September 2025. The state's recycling rates for beverage containers had also increased from 35 per cent to 65 per cent. The scheme in Victoria had collected around 1.8 billion containers between its launch in November 2023 to June 2025. Recycling rates for drinks containers sold in the state also grew from around 30 per cent in November 2023 to 69 per cent in the last quarter of 2025. In Tasmania, 30 million containers had been collected from its launch in May 2025 to September 2025.

A study published in June 2025 partly attributed container deposit schemes for a 39 per cent reduction in the density of plastic pollution in coastal areas around Australia’s cities over the previous decade.

== See also ==
- Waste management in Australia
- Recycling in Australia
- Environment of Australia
- Litter in Australia
- Container deposit legislation
