= Environment Protection Act 1993 =

The Environment Protection Act 1993 is a law in the Australian state of South Australia "to provide for the protection of the environment; to establish the Environment Protection Authority and define its functions and powers; and for other purposes."

== See also ==
- Environment of Australia
- Climate change in Australia
- Law of Australia
