= Litter Act 1979 (Western Australia) =

Western Australian anti-litter law

Parliament of Western Australia
- Long title: An Act to make provision for the abatement of litter, to establish, incorporate and confer powers upon the Keep Australia Beautiful Council (W.A.), and for incidental and other purposes.
- Citation: No. 81 of 1979
- Royal assent: 11 December 1979
- Status: In force

The Litter Act 1979 was an act passed by the Western Australian Government to prevent littering. It helped to set up the Keep Australia Beautiful Council (W.A.).

== See also ==
- Litter in Australia
