= Pollution haven hypothesis =

Conjecture that businesses look for the cheapest option when locating factories abroad

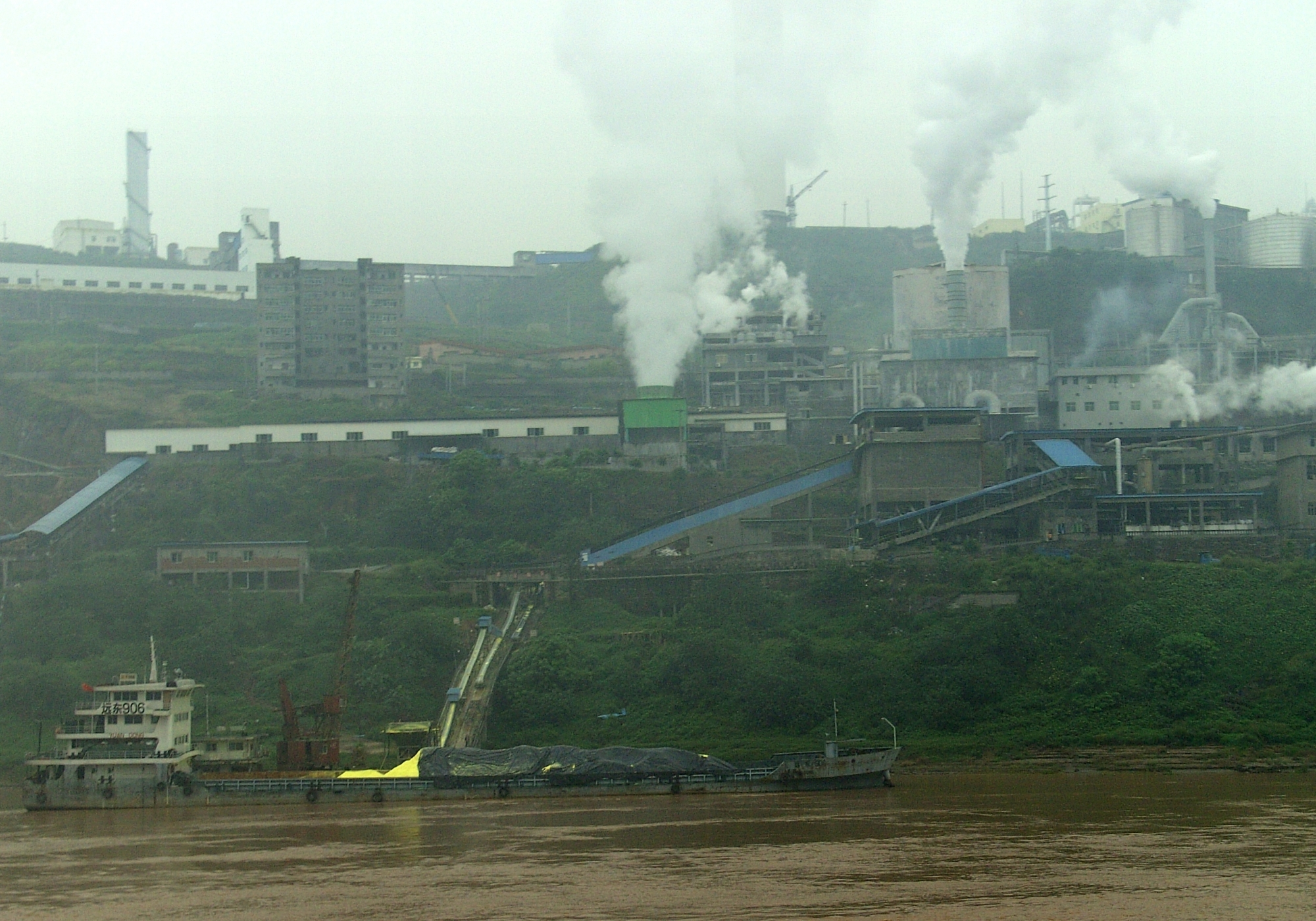
Factory with smokestacks overlooking the Yangtze River

The pollution haven hypothesis posits that, when large industrialized nations seek to set up factories or offices abroad, they will often look for the cheapest option in terms of resources and labor that offers the land and material access they require. However, this often comes at the cost of environmentally unsound practices. Developing nations with cheap resources and labor tend to have less stringent environmental regulations, and conversely, nations with stricter environmental regulations become more expensive for companies as a result of the costs associated with meeting these standards. Thus, companies that choose to physically invest in foreign countries tend to (re)locate to the countries with the lowest environmental standards or weakest enforcement.

== Three scales of the hypothesis ==
1. Pollution control costs have an impact at the margins, where they exert some effect on investment decisions and trade flows.
2. Pollution control costs are important enough to measurably influence trade and investment.
3. Countries set their environmental standards below socially-efficient levels in order to attract investment or to promote their exports.

Scales 1 and 2 have empirical support, but the significance of the hypothesis relative to other investment and trade factors is still controversial. One study found that environmental regulations have a strong negative effect on a country's FDI, particularly in pollution-intensive industries when measured by employment. However, that same study found that the environmental regulations present in a country's neighbors have an insignificant impact on that country's trade flows.

== Formula and variations ==
Yi = αRi + XiβI + εi

In the above formula, Y is economic activity, R is regulatory stringency, X is an aggregate of other characteristics that affect Y and ε is an error term. Theoretically, by changing your value of R, analysts will be able to calculate the expected effect on economic activity. According to the Pollution Haven Hypothesis, this equation shows that environmental regulations and economic activity are negatively correlated, because regulations raise the cost of key inputs to goods with pollution-intensive productions and reduce jurisdictions' comparative advantage in these goods. This lack of comparative advantage causes firms to move to countries with lower environmental standards, decreasing Y.

There is also an expanded formula, as shown below:

Yit = vi + αRit + γTit + θRitTit + X’βit + εit

This expanded formula takes into account whether trade liberalization (i.e. the level of trade barriers that exist in a country, labeled as T) increases the negative correlation between economic activity (Y) and regulatory stringency (R). Some authors claim that trade barriers disproportionately effect the environment, and this equation attempts to quantify the interaction between trade barriers and regulatory stringency, and the corresponding effect with respect to output in an economy.

== Connection with the environmental Kuznets curve ==
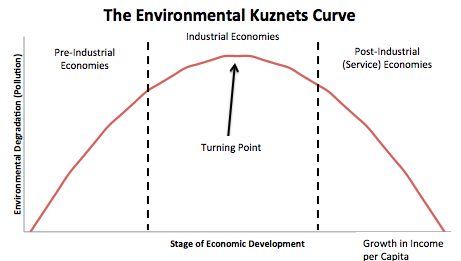
A simple recreation of the Environmental Kuznets Curve, made using Microsoft Excel.

The environmental Kuznets curve (EKC) is a conceptual model that suggests that a country's pollution concentrations rise with development and industrialization up to a turning point, after which they fall again as the country uses its increased affluence to reduce pollution concentrations, suggesting that the cleaner environment in developed countries comes at the expense of a dirtier environment in developing countries. In this sense, the EKC is potentially a reflection of the Pollution Haven Hypothesis, because one of the factors that may drive the increase in environmental degradation seen in pre-industrial economies is an influx of waste from post-industrial economies. This same transfer of polluting firms through trade and foreign investment could lead to the decrease in environmental degradation seen in downward-sloping section of the EKC, which models post-industrial (service) economies. This model holds true in cases of national development, but cannot necessarily be applied at a local scale.

== Real-world example ==
Used lead–acid batteries that Americans turn in to be recycled are increasingly being sent to Mexico, where the lead inside them is extracted by crude methods that are illegal in the United States. In 2009, the Environmental Protection Agency significantly tightened National Ambient Air Quality Standards for lead pollution, which made domestic recycling more difficult and expensive in the United States, but did not prohibit companies from exporting the work and danger to countries where environmental standards are low and enforcement is lax. Following this change, exports of used lead-acid batteries increased four-fold, which was followed by a significant increase in babies born with low birth weight to mothers living within a two-mile (3.2 km) radius of Mexican battery-recycling plants. In this sense, Mexico serves as a pollution haven for the United States battery industry because Mexican environmental officials acknowledge that they lack the money, manpower, and technical capacity to police the flow. According to The New York Times in 2011, 20% of spent American vehicle and industrial batteries were being exported to Mexico, up from 6% in 2007, meaning that approximately 20 million batteries would cross the border that year. A significant proportion of this flow was being smuggled in after being mislabeled as metal scrap.

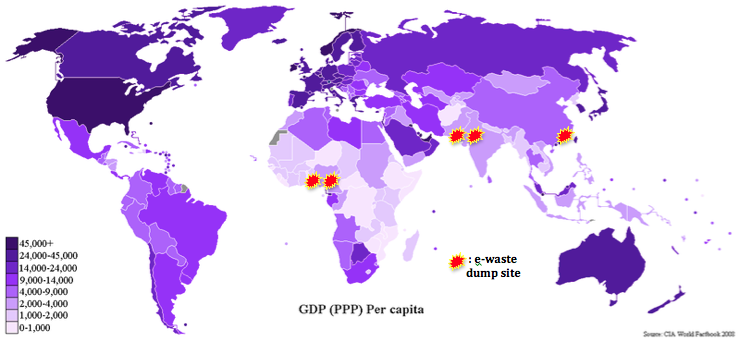
Map of GDP PPP per-capita and known e-waste dump sites (2013)

The world map shown here illustrates how e-waste dump sites (or sites where citizens or multinational corporations of industrialized nations dump their used electronic devices) along with the GDP PPP per-capita of those countries.

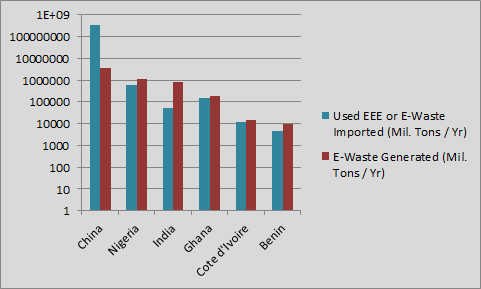
Shows an estimated amount of Used EEE and E-Waste imported into Kyoto Protocol Non-Annex 1 countries, with the E-Waste generated by each country's own domestic supplies.

While GDP PPP per-capita is not a perfect indicator of economic development, and e-waste dump sites are only one small facet of what could be a greater pollution haven, this map does illustrate how e-waste dump sites are often located in poorer, relatively pre-industrial nations, which provides some rudimentary support for the Pollution Haven Hypothesis.

Despite e-waste sites in South America there is more to look into, the East Asia area where most of the global manufacturing happen. Foreign companies will relocate factories to operate in areas where there is minimal environmental regulations, saving money on waste disposal and labor. Guiyu, a city in China that turned into a hub for electronic waste (e-waste) processing, attracting waste from developed countries due to its lack of environmental regulations and cheap labor. Informal recycling operations led to significant environmental contamination, with water samples showing lead levels 190 times higher than World Health Organization safety standards. Approximately 80% of children in Guiyu suffered from lead poisoning, illustrating the health impacts on vulnerable populations. In 1979, Asia Rare Earth (ARE), partly owned by Mitsubishi Chemical Industries Ltd, established a rare earth extraction plant in Bukit Merah, Perak, Malaysia. The facility began operations in 1982, extracting yttrium from monazite, a process that produced radioactive waste. The disposal of this waste led to severe environmental contamination, resulting in health issues among local residents. Mitsubishi is one of the top Japanese company that makes vehicles and their cars are manufactured in many countries like Japan, Thailand, Indonesia, China, the Philippines, Vietnam, and Russia. Clearly Malaysia is not among the list and their intention of operating mines of extracting radioactive chemicals materials at Malaysia is clear, for the advantage of the lack of environmental regulations.

== Areas of controversy ==
The first area of controversy with respect to the Pollution Haven Theory has to do with the formulas above. Finding an appropriate measure of regulatory stringency (R) is not simple, because we want to know how much more costly production is in a given jurisdiction relative to others due to that jurisdiction's environmental regulations. The compliance costs stemming from these regulations, however, could come in the form of environmental taxes, regulatory delays, the threat or execution of lawsuits, product redesign, or emissions limits. This proliferation of cost styles makes R hard to quantify.

Another major critique of the second formula is that it is difficult to measure regulatory stringency and trade barriers because the two effects are likely endogenous, so few studies have attempted to estimate the indirect effect of trade liberalization on pollution havens. Furthermore, governments at times engage in inefficient competition to actually attract polluting industries through weakening their environmental standards. However, as per conventional economic theory, welfare-maximizing governments should set standards so that the benefits justify the costs at the margin. This does not mean that environmental standards will be equal everywhere, as jurisdictions have different assimilative capacities, costs of abatement, and social attitudes regarding the environment, meaning heterogeneity in pollution standards is to be expected. By extension, this means that industry migration to less stringent jurisdictions may not raise efficiency concerns in an economic sense.

A final area of controversy is whether the Pollution Haven Hypothesis has empirical support. For example, studies have found statistically significant evidence that countries with poor air quality do have higher net factor exports of coal, but the magnitude of the impact is small relative to other variables. Paul Krugman, a Nobel Prize–winning economist, is skeptical as to whether pollution havens have empirical support in economic theory, as he writes, "At this point it's hard to come up with major examples of industries in which the pollution haven phenomenon, to the extent that it occurs, leads to international negative externalities. This does not, however, say that such examples cannot arise in the future."

Scale 3 above has had empirical arguments made specifically against it, especially in the last 20 years. Some economists argue that once higher environmental standards are introduced in a country, larger multinational firms present in the country are likely to push for enforcement so as to reduce the cost advantage of smaller local firms. This effect would make countries with strict environmental standards a haven for the large companies often associated with higher levels of pollution, meaning the polluting agents may be smaller companies, rather than the larger MNCs as theorized by other proponents of the Pollution Haven Hypothesis.

== See also ==
- Environmental dumping
- Environmental racism
- Fenceline community
- Global waste trade
- Locally unwanted land use
- Pollution in China
- Race to the bottom
- Summers memo
- Trading Up (book)
- Toxic colonialism
