= Max Liboiron =

Canadian academic

- Citizenship: Canadian
- Title: Professor
- Awards: College of New Scholars, Artists, and Scientists, Royal Society of Canada

Academic background
- Education: New York University Ph.D Stony Brook University MFA, grad certificate Mount Allison University BFA
- Thesis: Redefining Pollution: Plastics in the Wild (2012)

Academic work
- Discipline: Geography; Sociology
- Sub-discipline: Science and technology studies
- Institutions: Memorial University of Newfoundland
- Website: maxliboiron.com

Max Liboiron is a Canadian researcher and designer known for their contributions to the study of plastic pollution and citizen science.

== Career ==
Liboiron directs the Civic Laboratory for Environmental Action Research (CLEAR), an interdisciplinary plastic pollution laboratory based at the Memorial University of Newfoundland and Labrador. Liboiron was the Managing Editor of the online journal Discard Studies for nearly a decade, which publishes research on industrial waste and its social, political, cultural, and economic implications.

Liboiron is professor of geography at Memorial, with cross-appointments to the university's Department of Sociology, Environmental Sciences, and the Fisheries and Marine Institute. From 2018 to 2020, they served as Memorial's inaugural Associate Vice-president, Indigenous Research.

== Research Methods ==
Liboiron and their lab have created several research methods aimed to bring humility, accountability, and good land relations into research. These include: community peer review, where people who are impacted by research are part of the review process to validate and publish research; returning biological samples back to the land; university-level policies requiring consent from Indigenous groups to engage in research on their lands and communities; and a legal contract for Indigenous data sovereignty where Indigenous groups own and control how data about their lands, people, and culture are used.

Liboiron has invented build-it-yourself tools for monitoring marine plastic pollution, including a device called BabyLegs. The Cooper Hewitt, Smithsonian Design Museum exhibited BabyLegs as part of its Nature—Cooper Hewitt Design Triennial from May 2019 to January 2020, which recognized designers "forging meaningful connections between humanity and the Earth".

Liboiron is a proponent of the Global Open Science Hardware (GOSH) movement, which argues that high equipment costs and intellectual property restrictions stifle scientific progress.

== Equity in academia ==
An example of Liboiron's equity in academia is deciding author order by consensus; valuing care work and other forms of labour that are usually left out of scientific value systems; and taking intersectional social standing into account. Other examples include using anti-oppressive facilitation to run lab meetings, and consensus-based decision making in the lab.

== Writing ==
=== Pollution is Colonialism ===
Liboiron's book Pollution is Colonialism argues that the environmental policies of many jurisdictions, and the dominant science upon which those policies are based, are characterized by colonialism.

=== Redefining pollution and action: The matter of plastics ===
Their article Redefining pollution and action argues that in order to find attainable solutions to plastic pollution, it is necessary to consider the physical characteristics of plastics, such as density, size, or their molecular bonds. Many people think of marine plastics as what is seen on land: plastic bottles, plastic bags, food wrappers, etc. Liboiron instead emphasizes the definition of marine plastics as the small microplastics that are harmful to life. This idea of harm is explored extensively throughout the article. The metaphor “toxic smog” is created by Liboiron and the others on the voyage from Bermuda to New York City to help common people and large plastic producing companies understand the harm. As explained, most people know that smog consists of particles in the air that are basically invisible to the human eye but harmful to health. Similarly, the microplastics in the ocean are also invisible, mostly because not many people are traveling to the middle of the ocean or to the ocean floor where most microplastics settle. Plastic is not the only cause of harm as their chemical additives, called monomers and plasticizers that sit on plastics and can detach at any point, cause additional harm. Today, studying the effects these toxic chemicals have on humans and animals is very difficult. Every human and animal that has been tested carries chemicals from plastics either directly or from monomers and plasticizers. This problem makes it impossible to create control groups to closely study the exact harm of plastics. It is well known that plastics correlate with harm to health. What is not known, and difficult to ascertain, is which plastics produce which effects, the amount of plastic it takes to cause harm, and at what point can effects be considered harmful. A main goal of the article is to create change, mostly through legislation and advocacy.

== See also ==
- Ecocide
- Environmental dumping
- Environmental justice
- Environmental racism
- Global environmental inequality
- Global waste trade
- Rights of nature
- Sacrifice zone
- Toxic colonialism

== Awards ==
- 2015 Next Generation Polar Researchers, Memorial University of Newfoundland
- 2015 Making and Doing Prize, Society for the Social Studies of Science
- 2018 Nature Inspiration Award (adult category), Canadian Museum of Nature
- 2019–present Circle Holder, Science for the People
- 2020-2021 Distinguished Visiting Indigenous Faculty Research Fellow, Jackman Humanities Institute, University of Toronto
