= Sacrifice zone =

Area permanently changed by environmental or economic harm

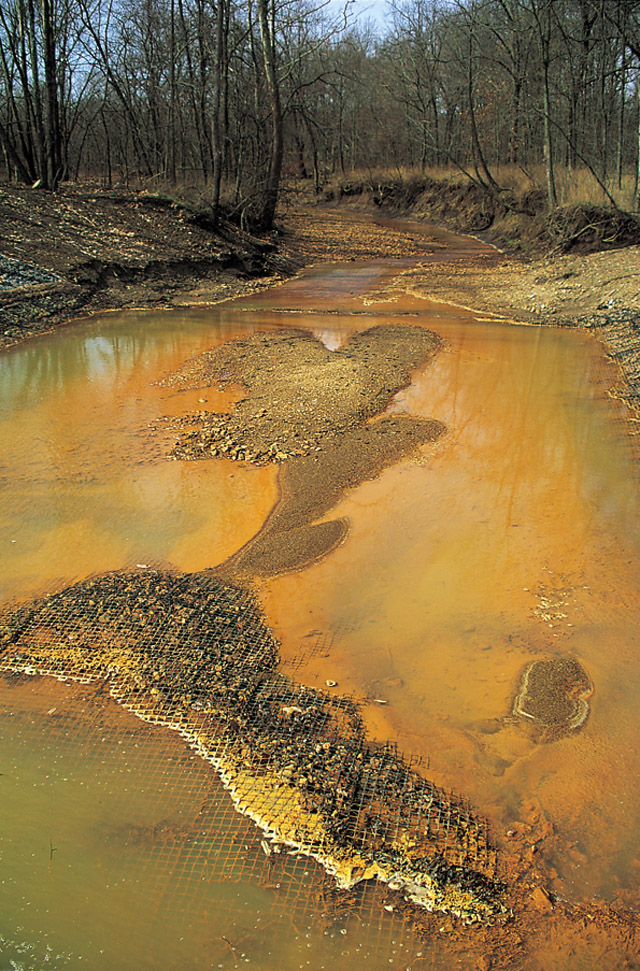
A sacrifice zone where iron hydroxide precipitate from coal mining has damaged a stream and surrounding area

A sacrifice zone or sacrifice area (often termed a national sacrifice zone or national sacrifice area) is a geographic area that has been permanently changed by heavy environmental alterations (usually to a negative degree) or economic disinvestment, often through locally unwanted land use (LULU). Commentators including Chris Hedges, Joe Sacco, and Steve Lerner have argued that corporate business practices contribute to producing sacrifice zones. A 2022 report by the United Nations highlighted that millions of people globally are in pollution sacrifice zones, particularly in zones used for heavy industry and mining. Moreover, this exposure disproportionately affects groups and communities that already experience systematic discrimination and marginalization.

== Definition ==
A sacrifice zone or sacrifice area is a geographic area that has been permanently changed by heavy environmental alterations (usually to a negative degree) or economic disinvestment, often through locally unwanted land use (LULU). Another definition states that sacrifice zones are places damaged through locally unwanted land use causing "chemical pollution where residents live immediately adjacent to heavily polluted industries or military bases."

For Ryan Juskus, sacrifice zones are "geographical areas that bore a disproportionate amount of industrial pollution, toxic chemical exposure, or other environmental harms associated with industry or national security" (p. 11). Another important aspect of this definition is that the existence of Sacrifice Zones involves the presence of Abundance Zones. In other words, the disproportionate environmental damage that some communities receive is directly related to maintaining privileges and lifestyles in other geographies. Another important aspect of sacrifice zones is that they are often located in low-income communities with a large presence of ethnic or religious minorities which benefits majority groups.

== Origin of the concept ==
According to the United Nations Human Rights Council, the term Sacrifice zone emerged in the Cold War period when nuclear testing, conducted by colonial powers, such as the United States, France, the United Kingdom, and the Soviet Union transformed sections of land into uninhabitable and highly radioactive areas. Sacrifice zones can be defined as communities that experience dangerous levels of hazardous contamination and waste exposure. Sacrifice zones are linked to racism, oppression, patriarchy, and colonialism, as they are hubs of pollution that disproportionately target and harm the physical and mental health of marginalized groups who face overlapping forms of oppressions.

According to Helen Huntington Smith, the term was first used in the U.S. discussing the long-term effects of strip-mining coal in the American West in the 1970s. The National Academy of Sciences/National Academy of Engineering Study Committee on the Potential for Rehabilitating Lands Surface Mined for Coal in the Western United States produced a 1973 report that introduced the term, finding:

In each zone the probability of rehabilitating an area depends upon the land use objectives, the characteristics of the site, the technology available, and the skill with which this technology is applied. At the extremes, if surface mined lands are declared national sacrifice areas, all ecological zones have a high probability of being successfully rehabilitated. If, however, complete restoration is the objective, rehabilitation in each zone has no probability of success.

Similarly in 1975, Genevieve Atwood wrote in Scientific American:

Surface mining without reclamation removes the land forever from productive use; such land can best be classified as a national sacrifice area. With successful reclamation, however, surface mining can become just one of a series of land uses that merely interrupt a current use and then return the land to an equivalent potential productivity or an even higher one.

Huntington Smith wrote in 1975, "The Panel that issued the cautious and scholarly National Academy of Sciences report unwittingly touched off a verbal bombshell" with the phrase National Sacrifice Area; "The words exploded in the Western press overnight. Seized upon by a people who felt themselves being served up as 'national sacrifices', they became a watchword and a rallying cry." The term sparked public debate, including among environmentalists and politicians such as future Colorado governor Richard Lamm.

The term continued to be used in the context of strip mining until at least 1999: "West Virginia has become an environmental sacrifice zone".

== Cases ==
A 2022 report by the United Nations highlighted that millions of people globally are in pollution sacrifice zones, particularly in zones used for heavy industry and mining. Moreover, this exposure disproportionately affects groups and communities that already experience systematic discrimination and marginalization.

=== Argentina ===
Villa Inflamable neighborhood is located in the city of Dock Sud and is part of the Greater Buenos Aires Metropolitan Area. The community is situated at the center of a petrochemical development area, where 44 hydrocarbon companies are currently operating. These same companies are mainly responsible for turning the Riachuelo-Matanza basin into one of the most polluted bodies of water in the world.

Reports from Argentinian and foreign public agencies have confirmed the presence of lead, chromium, benzene and other hazardous chemicals in the water supplies of the neighborhood, in amounts far in excess of what is allowed by international regulations. Journalistic and academic research has collected multiple testimonies of serious health diagnoses commonly associated with the presence of these contaminants. Likewise the book Flammable: Environmental Suffering in an Argentine Shantytown explores the effects of toxicity in the daily lives of the residents of the Inflammable neighborhood, referring to multiple diagnoses of lead poisoning among the inhabitants of Inflammable, especially among children.

=== Chile ===
The Chilean port of Quintero and adjacent Puchuncaví have been pointed out as a sacrifice zone. The zone hosts the coal-fired Ventanas Power Plant, an oil refinery, a cement storage, Fundición Ventanas, a copper smelter and refinery, a lubricant factory and a chemical terminal. In total 15 polluting companies operate in the area. In 2011, Escuela La Greda located in Puchuncaví, was engulfed in a chemical cloud from the Ventanas Industrial Complex. The sulfur cloud poisoned an estimated 33 children and 9 teachers, resulting in the relocation of the school. The old location of the school is now abandoned. In August and September 2018 there was a public health crisis in Quintero and Puchuncaví, where over 300 people experienced illness from toxic substances in the air, coming from the polluting industries.

=== Mexico ===
The Endhó Dam, often referred to as the "largest septic tank in Latin America" is a heavily polluted body of water that was built in the 1950s to supply irrigation water to the Mezquital Valley region of the State of Hidalgo and today receives about 70% of Mexico City's sewage effluent. The river that feeds the dam is also a major repository for industrial waste from an oil refinery, two large cement factories, and several industrial parks in the region. These sources of pollution have spread to nearby springs affecting people, animals and crops. Journalist Carlos Carabaña indicates that since 2007, the National Water Commission has issued reports to municipal and state authorities repeatedly informing them of the presence of high levels of heavy metals in the nearby wells, urging the authorities to take action because of the potential health risks posed by the dam. Other effects related to contamination from the dam include damage to crops in the communities neighboring the dam, poisoning of livestock, and stigmatization of agricultural products from the Mezquital Valley region.

=== United States ===
The US EPA affirmed in a 2004 report in response to the Office of Inspector General, that "the solution to unequal protection lies in the realm of environmental justice for all Americans. No community, rich or poor, black or white, should be allowed to become a 'sacrifice zone'."

Perhaps the best-known sacrifice zone in the United States is "Cancer Alley" in Louisiana, an 85-mile stretch of land along the Mississippi river containing over 200 petrochemical plants. Serious air and water quality violations have been documented since the 1970s, and elevated cancer risk has been found. The region's population is disproportionately black and low-income.

Commentators including Chris Hedges, Joe Sacco, Robert Bullard and Stephen Lerner have argued that corporate business practices contribute to producing sacrifice zones and that these zones most commonly exist in low-income and minority, usually African-American communities. Sacrifice zones are a central topic for the graphic novel Days of Destruction, Days of Revolt, written by Hedges and illustrated by Sacco.

In 2012, Hedges stated that examples of sacrifice zones included Pine Ridge, South Dakota, and Camden, New Jersey. In 2017 a West Calumet public housing project in East Chicago, Indiana, built at the former site of a lead smelter needed to be demolished and soil replaced to bring the area up to residential standards, displacing 1000 residents. In 2014, Naomi Klein wrote that "running an economy on energy sources that release poisons as an unavoidable part of their extraction and refining has always required sacrifice zones."

=== Venezuela ===
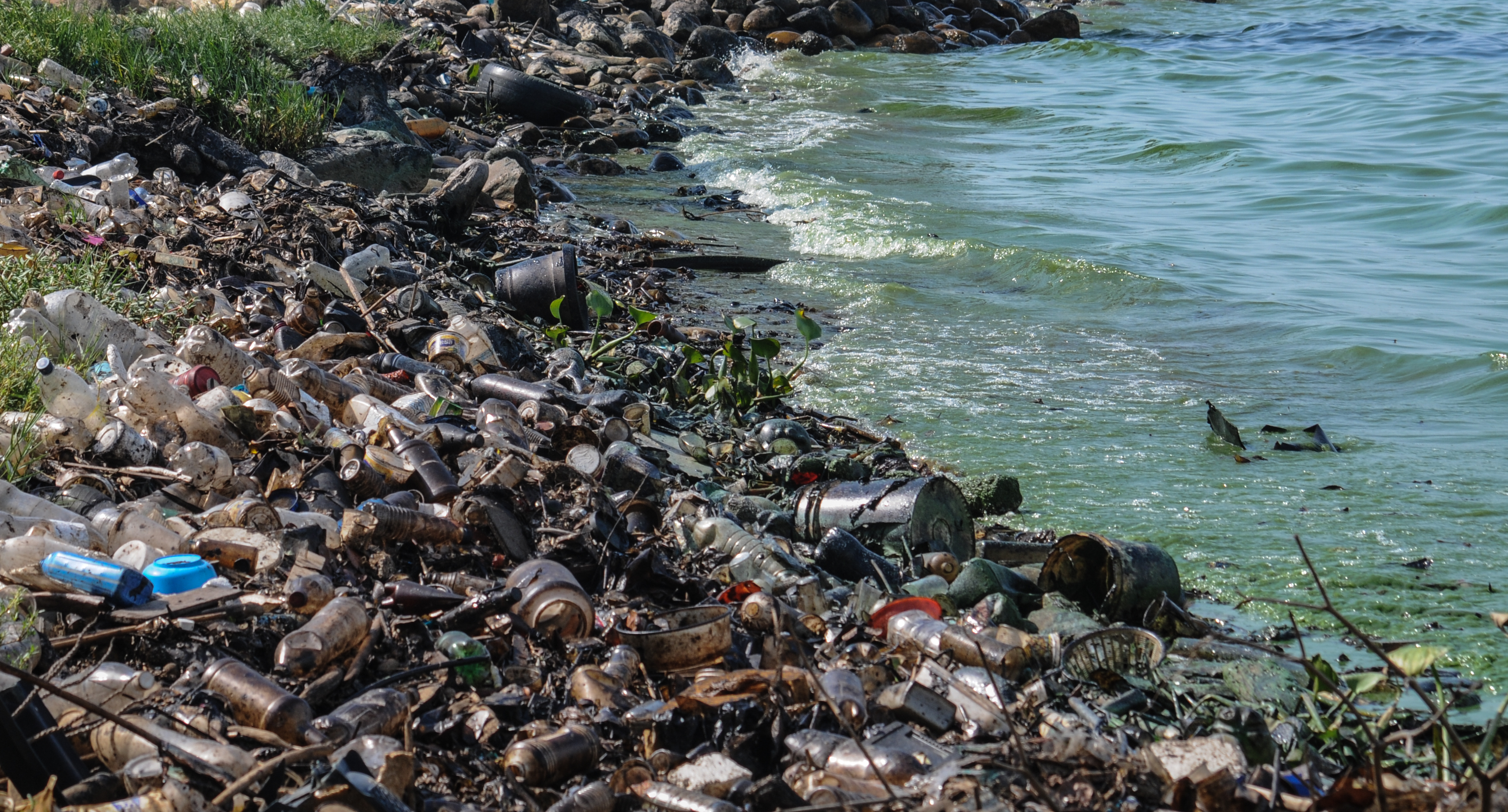
Pollution at Maracaibo Lake

Lake Maracaibo in the state of Zulia is one of the most important bodies of water in the western region of Venezuela. This lake was also the site of one of the worst environmental catastrophes in Venezuela's history: the Barroso II blowout in 1922; an oil well that began spewing huge quantities of oil for 9 days, spilling around 900,000 barrels in the area. This oil disaster, paradoxically, became a milestone for the abundance of the oil industry in the country.

Erick Camargo indicates that oil spills generated by the lack of maintenance of the complex network of oil infrastructure continue to be a constant and are the main cause of contamination in the lake. However, he also indicates that the use of agrochemicals on nearby crops and the discharge of sewage worsen the situation.

A 2022 scientific paper reveals the presence of multiple toxic elements in surface sediments in different parts of the lake. This constitutes a high risk for the flora and fauna of the region, as well as for the health of the human communities living in the areas where the samples were taken. Another study in 2007 revealed the presence of toxic metals in part of the subway aquifers connected to the lake basin; the samples taken had values well above the limits allowed for drinking water according to national and international regulations.

== Space industry ==
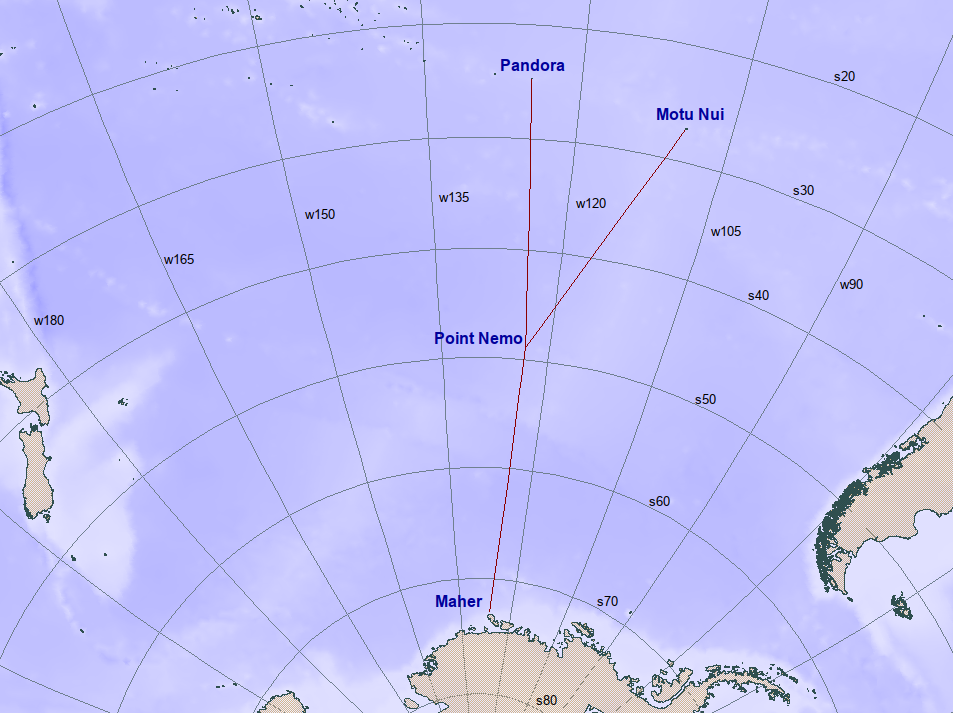
Point Nemo is also known as “the oceanic pole of inaccessibility” for being the point in any ocean farthest from land. It serves as a "spacecraft cemetery" for space infrastructure and vessels.

The human-environment interactions that lie at the heart of environmental justice, including sacrifice zones, have been proposed to also include the environmental sacrifice of regions beyond Earth. Klinger states that "the environmental geopolitics of Earth and outer space are inextricably linked by the spatial politics of privilege and sacrifice – among people, places and institutions". Dunnett has called outer space the 'ultimate sacrifice zone' that exemplifies a colonially framed pursuit of infinite opportunities for accumulation, exploitation, and pollution. This manifests in both terrestrial and space-based sacrifice zones related to launch infrastructure, waste, and orbital debris.

Point Nemo is an oceanic point of inaccessibility located inside the South Pacific Gyre. As the area farthest from land anywhere in the world, it serves as a "spacecraft cemetery" for space infrastructure and vessels. Between 1971 and 2018, 263 spacecraft and satellites were directed to crash in Point Nemo; this number includes the Mir Space Station (142 tonnes). As of 2023, the International Space Station (240 tonnes) is scheduled to crash into Point Nemo in 2031.

== See also ==
- Agroextractivism
- Chernobyl disaster
- Ecocide
- Environmental dumping
- Environmental justice
- Environmental racism
- Eutrophication
- Exclusion zone
- Global environmental inequality
- Global waste trade
- Pollution is Colonialism
- Toxic colonialism
