= Semia Gharbi =

Tunisian scientist and environmental activist

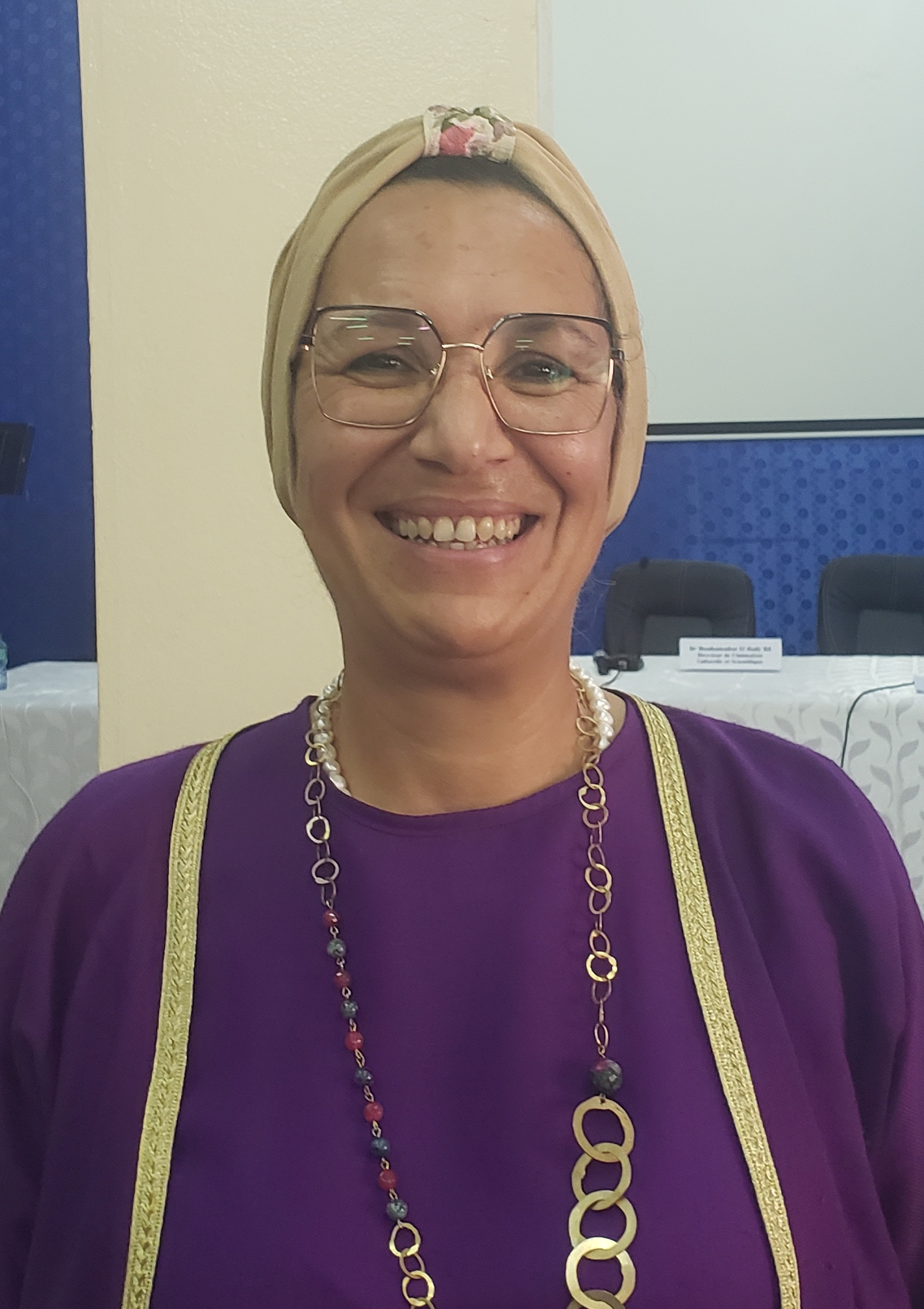
- Born: 1967 (age 58–59); Tunisia
- Occupations: Scientist; Environmental activist
- Organization(s): Founder and Chair, the Association of Environmental Education for Future Generations
- Awards: Goldman Environmental Prize 2025

Semia Gharbi (Arabic: سامية الغربي) is a Tunisian environmental scientist and environmental activist known for her activism against waste in Tunisia. An environmental researcher by trade, she founded and chairs the Association of Environmental Education for Future Generations, a NGO that works closely with the Tunisian government to spread awareness of hazardous chemicals, and also serves in many other environmental organizations. She rose to international recognition upon receiving the Goldman Environmental Prize for Africa in 2025 for her work with the Tunisian government to prevent dumping.

== Biography ==
Gharbi was raised in Tunisia and attended the Tunis El Manar University, where she earned a bachelor's degree. She holds a bachelor's degree in both biology and geology and a Master's Degree in environmental science. She also works as an activist and a teacher of environmental science at a master's level.

She founded the Association of Environmental Education for Future Generations in 2011, which she currently chairs. The organization partners with the Tunisian Ministry of Education to teach environmental awareness in schools and in universities and campaigns about lead paint, pollutants, and plastic. They also serve as the Middle East and North Africa regional coordinators for the International Pollutants Elimination Network. Her group has achieved a national band on 24 pollutants.

She also co-founded the Réseau Tunisie Verte, or the Tunisia Green Network.

She became well-known for calling out waste colonialism when she first noticed and began to challenge a shipment of waste from Italy into Tunisia in 2020. This waste was supposed to be recyclable waste, which was permitted, but was in reality largely non-recyclable, which was not permitted under the Basel Convention. Her investigation revealed a network of over 40 corrupt officials, and resulted in judicial proceedings, including against then-Minister of the Environment of Tunisia Mustapha Larouhi, by the end of 2020. She then spent time working on the international stage to draw attention to the issue, getting the UN Special Rapporteur to intervene and eventually sending the trash back to Italy. Her fight also resulted in strengthened regulations revolving around waste export in the EU.

She received the Goldman Environmental Prize in 2025.
