= Global waste trade =

International trade of waste between countries

The global waste trade is the international trade of waste between countries for further treatment, disposal, or recycling. Toxic or hazardous wastes are often imported by developing countries from developed countries.

The World Bank Report What a Waste: A Global Review of Solid Waste Management, describes the amount of solid waste produced in a given country. Specifically, countries which produce more solid waste are more economically developed and more industrialized. The report explains that "Generally, the higher the economic development and rate of urbanization, the greater the amount of solid waste produced." Therefore, countries in the Global North, which are more economically developed and urbanized, produce more solid waste than Global South countries.

Current international trade flows of waste follow a pattern of waste being produced in the Global North and being exported to and disposed of in the Global South. Multiple factors affect which countries produce waste and at what magnitude, including geographic location, degree of industrialization, and level of integration into the global economy.

Numerous scholars and researchers have linked the sharp increase in waste trading and the negative impacts of waste trading to the prevalence of neoliberal economic policy. With the major economic transition towards neoliberal economic policy in the 1980s, the shift towards "free-market" policy has facilitated the sharp increase in the global waste trade.

Specifically, developing countries have been targeted by trade liberalization policies to import waste as a means of economic expansion. The guiding neoliberal economic policy argues that the way to be integrated into the global economy is to participate in trade liberalization and exchange in international trade markets. Their claim is that smaller countries, with less infrastructure, less wealth, and less manufacturing ability, should take in hazardous wastes as a way to increase profits and stimulate their economies.

== Current debate over global waste trade ==
=== Arguments in support ===
Current supporters of global waste trade argue that importing waste is an economic transaction which can benefit countries with little to offer the global economy; countries which do not have the production capacity to manufacture high quality products can import waste to stimulate their economy.

Lawrence Summers, former President of Harvard University and Chief Economist of the World Bank, issued a confidential memo arguing for global waste trade in 1991. The memo stated:

"I think the economic logic behind dumping a load of toxic waste in the lowest wage country is impeccable and we should face up to that... I've always thought that countries in Africa are vastly under polluted; their air quality is probably vastly inefficiently low compared to Los Angeles... Just between you and me shouldn't the World Bank be encouraging more migration of the dirty industries to the Least Developed Countries?"

This position, which is mainly motivated by economics and financial profit in particular, demonstrates the main argument for global waste trade. The Cato Institute published an article supporting global waste trade suggesting that "there is little evidence that hazardous wastes, which are often chronic carcinogens, contribute to death rates in developing countries." Elaborating on this point, the article argues that "people in developing countries would rationally accept increased exposure to hazardous pollutants in exchange for opportunities to increase their productivity—and, hence, their income."

Overall, the argument for global waste trade rests largely upon a perception that developing countries need to further their economic development. Supporters suggest that in engaging in global waste trade, developing countries of the Global South will expand their economies and increase profits.

=== Critiques ===
Critics of global waste trade argue that lack of regulation and failed policies have allowed developing nations to become toxic dump yards for hazardous waste. The ever-increasing amounts of hazardous waste being shipped to developing countries increases the disproportionate risk that the people in these nations face. Critics of the effects of the global waste trade emphasize the enormous amount of hazardous wastes that people in poorer countries must deal with. They highlight the fact that most of the world's hazardous wastes are produced by Western countries (the United States and Europe), yet the people who suffer negative health effects from these wastes are from poorer countries that did not produce the waste.

Peter Newell, Professor of Development Studies, argues that "environmental inequality reinforces and, at the same time reflects, other forms of hierarchy and exploitation along lines of class, race and gender." Arguing that the detrimental effects of hazardous waste trade affect the disadvantaged more than others, critics of global waste trade suggest that the implications of dumping hazardous waste has significant consequences for people of color, women, and low-income people in particular.

Critiquing the global waste trade for reproducing inequality on a global scale, many activists, organizers, and environmentalists from regions affected in the Global South have vocalized their disappointment with global waste trade policies. Evo Morales, former President of Bolivia, argues against the current economic system forcing the exploitation of his country and people. He claims:

"If we want to save the planet earth, to save life and humanity, we have a duty to put an end to the capitalist system. Unless we put an end to the capitalist system, it is impossible to imagine that there will be equality and justice on this planet earth. This is why I believe that it is important to put an end to the exploitation of human beings and to the pillage of natural resources, to put an end to destructive wars for markets and raw materials, to the plundering of energy, particularly fossil fuels, to the excessive consumption of goods and to the accumulation of waste. The capitalist system only allows us to heap up waste."

Jean Francois Kouadio, an African native living near a toxic dump site in the Ivory Coast, explains his experience with the effects of toxic substances lingering throughout his community. With major Western corporations dumping their toxic wastes in the Ivory Coast, Kuoadio has lost two children to the effects of toxic wastes. He describes the loss of his second daughter Ama Grace, and how the doctors "said she suffered from acute glycemia caused by the toxic waste." In addition to critics from the Global South, researchers and scholars in the West have begun critiquing the uneven distribution of negative effects these hazardous waste dumpings are causing. Dorceta Taylor, Professor at the University of Michigan, argues how Women of Color in the United States are disproportionately affected by these policies:

"Women of color have been at the forefront of the struggle to bring attention to the issues that are devastating minority communities – issues such as hazardous waste disposal; exposure to toxins; ...Their communities, some of the most degraded environments ... are repositories of the waste products of capitalist production and excessive consumption. As a result, they have been in the vanguard of the struggle for environmental justice; they are the founders of environmental groups, grassroots activists, researchers, conference organizers, workshop leaders, lobbyists, and campaign and community organizers."

T.V. Reed, Professor of English and American Studies at Washington State University, argues that the correlation between historical colonialism and toxic colonialism is based on perceptions of indigenous land as 'waste'. He argues that Western cultures have deemed indigenous land as "underdeveloped" and "empty", and that the people inhabiting it are therefore less "civilized". Using the historical premises of colonialism, toxic colonialism reproduces these same arguments by defining Global South land as expendable for Western wastes.

==== Toxic colonialism ====
Toxic colonialism, defined as the process by which "underdeveloped states are used as inexpensive alternatives for the export or disposal of hazardous waste pollution by developed states," is the core critique against the global waste trade. Toxic colonialism represents the neocolonial policy which continues to maintain global inequality today through unfair trade systems. Toxic colonialism uses the term colonialism because "the characteristics of colonialism, involving economic dependence, exploitation of labour, and cultural inequality are intimately associated within the new realm of toxic waste colonialism."

== Electronic waste ==
Electronic waste, also known as e-waste, refers to discarded electrical or electronic devices. A rapidly growing surplus of electronic waste around the world has resulted from quickly evolving technological advances, changes in media (tapes, software, MP3), falling prices, and planned obsolescence. An estimated 50 million tons of e-waste are produced each year, the majority of which comes from the United States and Europe. Most of this electronic waste is shipped to developing countries in Asia and Africa to be processed and recycled.

Various studies have investigated the environmental and health effects of this e-waste upon the people who live and work around electronic waste dumps. Heavy metals, toxins, and chemicals leak from these discarded products into surrounding waterways and groundwater, poisoning the local people. People who work in these dumps, local children searching for items to sell, and people living in the surrounding communities are all exposed to these deadly toxins.

One city suffering from the negative results of the hazardous waste trade is Guiyu, China, which has been called the electronic waste dump of the world. It may be the world's largest e-waste dump, with workers dismantling over 1.5 million pounds of junked computers, cell phones and other electronic devices per year.

== Incinerator ash ==
Incinerator ash is the ash produced when incinerators burn waste in order to dispose of it. Incineration has many polluting effects which include, if uncontrolled in a modern Waste to Energy (WTE) plant, the potential release of various hazardous metals in leachate (water that has percolated through the ash). In North America, thanks to plant environmental controls, Waste to Energy ash leachate has repeatedly, over dozens of WTE plants and many years, tested as non-toxic.

=== Khian Sea incident ===
An example of incinerator ash being dumped onto the Global South from the Global North in an unjust trade exchange is the Khian Sea waste disposal incident. Carrying 14,000 tons of ash from an incinerator in Philadelphia, the cargo ship, Khian Sea, was to dispose of its waste. However, upon being rejected by the Dominican Republic, Panama, Honduras, Bermuda, Guinea Bissau, and the Dutch Antilles, the crew finally dumped a portion of the ash near Haiti. After changing the name of the ship twice to try and conceal the original identity, Senegal, Morocco, Yemen, Sri Lanka, and Singapore still banned the ship's entry. Upon consistent rejections, the ash is believed to have been disposed of in the Atlantic and Indian Oceans.

Following this disaster of handling hazardous waste, the Haitian government banned all waste imports leading a movement to recognize all of the disastrous consequences of this global waste trade. Based on the Khian Sea waste disposal incident and similar events, the Basel Convention was written to resist what is known to developing countries as 'toxic colonialism.' It was open for signature in March 1989 and went into effect in May 1992. The U.S. has signed the treaty, but has yet to ratify it.

== Chemical waste ==
Chemical waste is the excess and unusable waste from hazardous chemicals, mainly produced by large factories. It is extremely difficult and costly to dispose of. It poses many problems and health risks upon exposure, and must be carefully treated in toxic waste processing facilities.

=== Italy dumping hazardous chemicals in Nigeria ===
One example of chemical waste being exported from the Global North onto the Global South was the event of an Italian business man seeking to avoid European economic regulations. Allegedly exporting 4,000 tons of toxic waste, containing 150 tons of polychlorinated biphenyls, or PCBs, the Italian businessman made $4.3 million in shipping hazardous waste to Nigeria. The Fordham Environmental Law Review published an article explaining the impacts of the toxic waste imposed on Nigeria in further detail:

"Mislabelling the garbage as fertilizers, the Italian company deceived a retired/illiterate timber worker into agreeing to store the poison in his backyard at the Nigerian river port of Koko for as little as 100 dollars a month. These toxic chemicals were exposed to the hot sun and to children playing nearby. They leaked into the Koko water system resulting in the death of nineteen villagers who ate contaminated rice from a nearby farm."

This is just one example of how the traditional trade flow, from developed Western countries has severely, unfairly, and disproportionately impacted developing countries in the Global South.

=== Shipbreaking in Asia ===
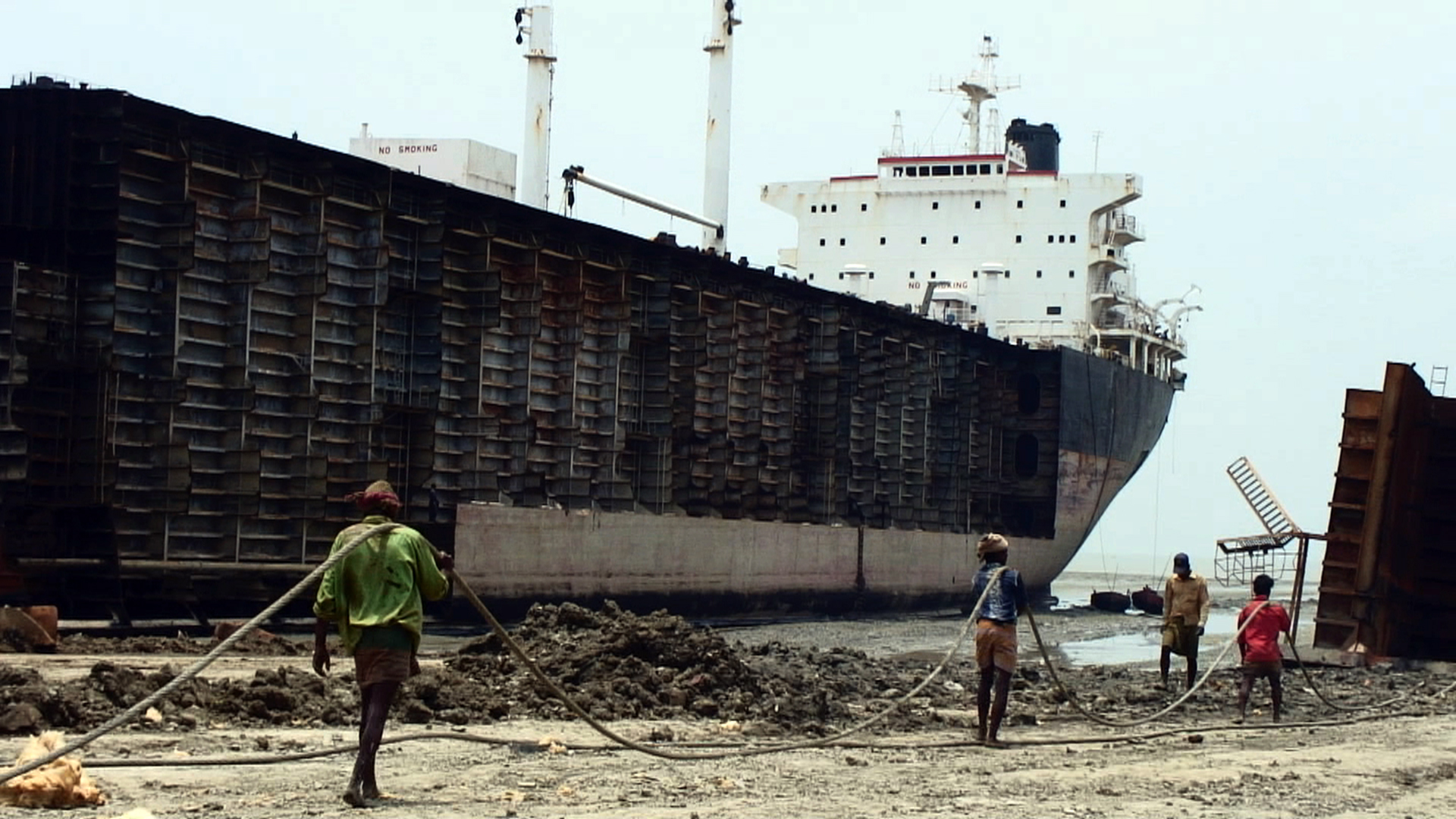
Shipbreaking in Chittagong, Bangladesh

Another danger to developing countries is the growing issue of shipbreaking, which is occurring mainly in Asia. Industrialized countries seeking to retire used vessels find it cheaper to send these ships to Asia for dismantling. China and Bangladesh are seen as the two hubs of shipbreaking in Asia. One of the main issues lies in the fact that these ships which are now too aged to continue, were constructed at a time with less environmental regulation. In an environmental fact sheet, researchers demonstrate the immense impact this new toxic trade sector has on workers and the environment. For one, the older ships contain health-damaging substances such as asbestos, lead oxide, zinc chromates, mercury, arsenic, and tributyltin.

In addition, shipbreaking workers in China and in other developing countries traditionally lack proper equipment or protective gear when handling these toxic substances.

== Plastic waste ==
The trade in plastic waste has been identified as the main cause of marine litter. (Note: "Campaigners have identified the global trade in plastic waste as a main culprit in marine litter, because the industrialised world has for years been shipping much of its plastic “recyclables” to developing countries, which often lack the capacity to process all the material.") Countries importing the waste plastics often lack the capacity to process all the material. As a result, the United Nations has restrictions on the trade of waste plastic trade unless it meets certain criteria. (Note: "The new UN rules will effectively prevent the US and EU from exporting any mixed plastic waste, as well plastics that are contaminated or unrecyclable — a move that will slash the global plastic waste trade when it comes into effect in January 2021.")

== Impact ==
The global waste trade has had negative effects for many people, particularly in poorer, developing nations. These countries often do not have safe recycling processes or facilities, and people process the toxic waste with their bare hands. Hazardous wastes are often not properly disposed of or treated, leading to poisoning of the surrounding environment and resulting in illness and death in people and animals. Many people have experienced illnesses or death due to the unsafe way these hazardous wastes are handled.

=== Effects upon the environment ===
The hazardous waste trade has disastrous effects upon the environment and natural ecosystems. Various studies explore how the concentrations of persistent organic pollutants have poisoned the areas surrounding the dump sites, killing numerous birds, fish, and other wildlife. There are heavy metal chemical concentrations in the air, water, soil, and sediment in and around these toxic dump areas, and the concentration levels of heavy metals in these areas are extremely high and toxic.

=== Implications for human health ===
The hazardous waste trade has serious damaging effects upon the health of humans. People living in developing countries may be more vulnerable to the dangerous effects of the hazardous waste trade, and are particularly at risk from developing health problems. The methods of disposal of these toxic wastes in developing countries expose the general population (including future generations) to the highly toxic chemicals. These toxic wastes are often disposed of in open landfills, burned in incinerators, or in other dangerous processes. Workers wear little to no protective gear when processing these toxic chemicals, and are exposed to these toxins through direct contact, inhalation, contact with soil and dust, as well as oral intake of contaminated locally produced food and drinking water. Health problems resulting from these hazardous wastes affect humans by causing cancers, diabetes, alterations in neurochemical balances, hormone disruptions from endocrine disruptors, skin alterations, neurotoxicity, kidney damage, liver damage, bone disease, emphysema, ovotoxicity, reproductive damage, and many other fatal diseases. The improper disposal of these hazardous wastes creates fatal health problems, and is a serious public health risk.

=== In politics ===
On April 24, 2018, President Rodrigo Duterte of the Philippines threatened to declare war if Canada failed again to retrieve the 64 tonnes of garbages that they mistakenly labelled as recyclable. The said cargos of garbages from Canada was shipped by a private company that recycled plastic material last 2016. Duterte is already known for blatant comments and aggressive behaviour. During the ASEAN Summit hosted in Manila, Philippines, the Prime Minister Justin Trudeau attended and was controversially ask what actions they can do to solve this issue. Trudeau promised that they will bring back the Canadian garbage from Philippines but two years later it was compromised. Duterte gave the Canadian government until May 30 or the Philippine government supreme court will escalate it in international court of justice. This is also known as the Philippine-Canada waste war.

After a month, Malaysia is the second Asian nation who escalate the illegal garbage trading from Canada, UK, Japan and US. According to the Malaysian Minister of Environment; Yeo Bee Yin made a strong statement that Malaysians will not accept garbages from developed countries because this is against to Malaysian human rights.

China also restricts imports of garbages from developed countries and now Asian nations such Thailand, Indonesia, Vietnam and Myanmar became the next garbage dump of the developed countries which is unethical.

== International responses to global waste trade issues ==
There have been various international responses to the problems associated with the global waste trade and multiple attempts to regulate it for over thirty years. The hazardous waste trade has proven difficult to regulate as there is so much waste being traded, and laws are often difficult to enforce. Furthermore, there are often large loopholes in these international agreements that allow countries and corporations to dump hazardous wastes in dangerous ways. The most notable attempt to regulate the hazardous waste trade has been the Basel Convention.

=== International treaties and relevant trade law ===
==== Basel Convention ====
The Basel Convention on the Control of Transboundary Movements of Hazardous Wastes and Their Disposal, usually known as the Basel Convention, is an international treaty that plays a crucial role in regulating the transnational movement of hazardous wastes. The Basel Convention was created in 1989 and attempts to regulate the hazardous waste trade, specifically to prevent the dumping of hazardous waste from more developed countries into less developed countries. The Basel Convention was developed following a series of high-profile cases in which large amounts of toxic waste were dumped into less developed countries, poisoning the people and environment. The Convention seeks to reduce the creation of hazardous wastes, and to control and reduce its trade across borders.

The Convention was opened for signatures on 22 March 1989, and officially entered into force on 5 May 1992. As of May 2014, 180 states and the European Union are parties to the Convention. Haiti and the United States have signed the Convention but not ratified it.

==== ENFORCE ====
The Environmental Network for Optimizing Regulatory Compliance on Illegal Traffic (ENFORCE) is an agency staffed by relevant experts to promote compliance with the Basel Convention. It is an international body created to deal with transboundary issues of the international hazardous waste trade. Because the issue of the transnational hazardous waste trade crosses many borders and affects many nations, it has been important to have a multinational, multilateral organization presiding over these affairs. The members of ENFORCE include one representative from each of the five United Nations regions that are parties to the Convention as well as five representatives from the Basel Convention regional and coordinating centers, based on equitable geographical representation. Members of organizations such as the United Nations Environmental Programme (UNEP), International Criminal Police Organization (INTERPOL), NGOs working to prevent and stop illegal traffic such as the Basel Action Network (BAN), and many other organizations are also eligible to become members of ENFORCE.

==== Protocol on Liability and Compensation ====
In 1999 the Basel Convention passed the Protocol on Liability and Compensation that sought to improve regulatory measures and better protect people from hazardous waste. The Protocol on Liability and Compensation attempts to “assign appropriate liability procedures when the transboundary movements of hazardous wastes result in damages to human health and the environment”. The Protocol “imposes strict liability for damages in situations involving Parties to the Basel Convention, but only while they maintain control of the hazardous waste through their respective notifying, transporting, or disposing entities.” It seeks to regulate and ensure countries’ and corporations’ compliance with the Basel Convention laws. However, this Protocol remains unsigned by most countries, so its applicability is limited.

==== Lomé IV Convention and Cotonou Agreement ====
In an effort to protect themselves against unfair hazardous waste dumping, the African, Caribbean, and Pacific States (ACP) signed the Lome IV Convention, which is a supplement to the Basel Convention and prohibits the “export of hazardous wastes from the European Community to ACP States.” This Convention is one attempt by developing countries to protect themselves from Western countries exporting their waste to poorer nations through the hazardous waste trade. When the Lomé IV Convention expired in 2000, the ACP countries and the European countries entered into a new agreement known as the Cotonou Agreement, which “recognizes the existence of disproportionate risks in developing countries and desires to protect against inappropriate hazardous waste shipments to these countries.”

==== The Bamako Convention ====
In 1991 multiple developing nations in Africa met to discuss their dissatisfaction with the Basel Convention in regulating the dumping of hazardous waste into their countries, and designed a ban on the import of hazardous wastes into their countries called the Bamako Convention. The Bamako Convention is different from the Basel Convention in that Bamako “essentially bans the import of all hazardous waste generated outside of the OAU [the Organization of African Unity] for disposal or recycling and deems any import from a non-Party to be an illegal act.” However, these countries could not effectively implement the stipulations of the Convention and could not prevent the dump of toxic wastes due to limited resources and a lack of powerful enforcement. Therefore, the application of the Bamako Convention was very limited.

=== Critiques of these responses ===
Laura Pratt, expert on the hazardous waste trade, claims that despite local and international attempts to regulate the hazardous waste trade, the “current international agreements, both the widespread, legally binding agreements and the ad hoc agendas among smaller groups of countries, have not been as successful at eliminating toxic waste colonialism as proponents would have hoped.” She explains that there are various loopholes in the current system that allow toxic waste to continue being dumped, and toxic colonialism to go unchecked. Some of the problems with these international agreements include continued illegal shipments and unclear definitions of terms.

==== Fraudulent shipments and concealments ====
Pratt explains that despite attempts to regulate illegal dumping, “[o]ftentimes hazardous waste is simply moved under false permits, bribes, improper labels, or even the pretext of 'recycling,' which is a growing trend.” Companies often export their hazardous wastes to poorer countries through illegal smuggling. International agencies have raised concerns about illegal waste dumping, but attempts to regulate this market have been hindered by a lack of ability to monitor the trade, as many countries do not have any authoritative legislative bodies in place to prevent or punish the illegal trafficking of hazardous wastes. Furthermore, Pratt explains that without coordinated international methods to enforce the regulations, it is extremely difficult for countries to "control the illegal trade of hazardous waste, due to the disparity between enforcement resources and regulation uniformity.” Developing nations continue to bear the brunt of this illegal activity, and often do not have the resources or capability to protect themselves.

==== Issues with legal definitions ====
Another issue with the Basel Convention and other international agreements to regulate the waste trade is the difficulty of establishing clear, uniform definitions regarding wastes. These overly broad and ambiguous definitions cause problems with the international agreements, as different parties interpret the language of the agreements differently and thus act accordingly. For example, the “‘lack of distinction between ‘waste’ and ‘products’ in the convention and its vague criteria for ‘hazardous’ allowed the continued export of 'hazardous waste’ under the label of commodities or raw materials, despite the fact that these wastes still present environmental and health risks to developing countries.”

== See also ==
- Electronic waste § Global trade issues
- Environmental dumping
- Environmental justice
- Environmental racism
- Pollution haven hypothesis
- Pollution is Colonialism
- Sacrifice zone
- Toxic colonialism
