= Toxic colonialism =

Concept in environmental sociology

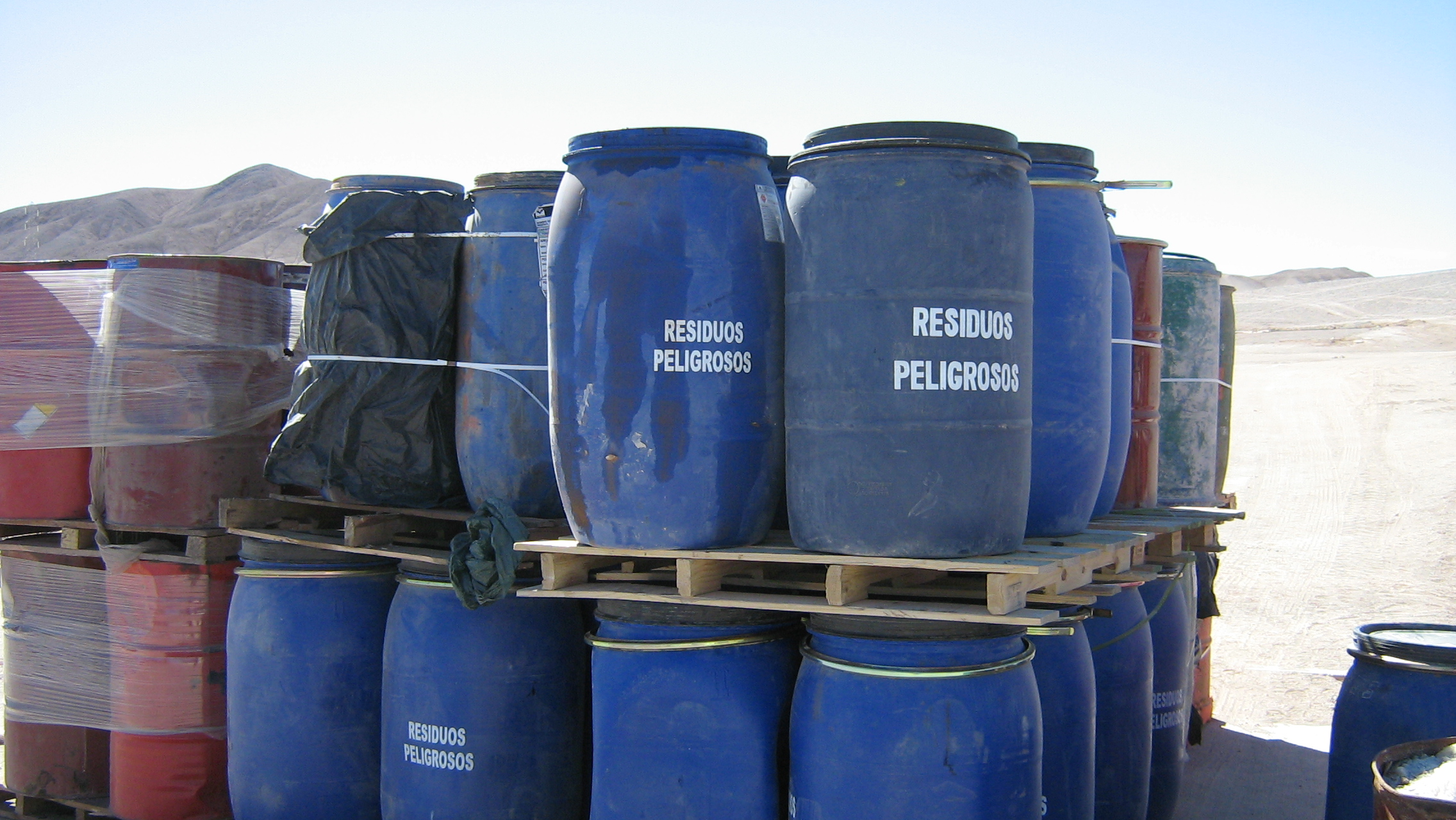
Drums with dangerous waste

Toxic colonialism, or toxic waste colonialism, is the practice of exporting hazardous waste from developed countries to underdeveloped ones for disposal.

== Background ==
In 1992, 'toxic colonialism' was a phrase coined by Jim Puckett of Greenpeace for the dumping of the industrial wastes of the West on territories of the Third World. The term refers to practices of developed nations who rid themselves of toxic or hazardous waste by shipping it to less developed areas of the world. The affected communities typically lack the resources, knowledge, political organization, or capital to resist the practice. In the US, the term may also be applied to exploitation of Native American reservations, where differing environment regulations allow the land to be more easily used for dump sites.

According to The Diplomat:

In the 1980s, developed nations began tightening legislation surrounding waste disposal and health standards. As a result, in order to avoid their own environmental regulations and the high cost associated with them, wealthy nations began to export their rubbish to developing nations. Rather than managing and containing their own plastic and hazardous waste, developed nations exported it by the container load to developing nations, which lacked adequate facilities to store or dispose of it. In the 1980s a new term was coined to describe this practice: "Waste colonialism."

== Significance ==
There have been numerous adverse effects of toxic colonialism on both people and the environment, although a reported positive of toxic colonialism includes economic gains to developing nations. History shows that the overall impact of the toxic waste dumping in these nations has been devastating and has severely compromised all aspects of human health. In a case study for the 2010 Geneva Convention, Bashir Mohamed Hussein, PhD details one account of toxic and radioactive waste dumping in Somalia and its effects, "UNEP...reported that the people were complaining of unusual health problems including "acute respiratory infections, heavy dry coughing, mouth bleeding, abdominal hemorrhage and unusual chemical skin reaction...Likewise, both Somali and non-Somali medical doctors working in Somalia have reported an excessive incidence of cancer, unknown diseases, spontaneous miscarriages of the pregnant women and child malformation." The significance of toxic waste on humans is made evident by the research along with the fact that those nations and their people that suffer from the effects of said colonialist behavior are those of those in developing nations without the resources, knowledge or capital to both understand the effects and tackle the treatment they have been subject to.

=== Socioeconomic aspects ===
Despite the many health effects of toxic colonialism, these effects are reportedly often overshadowed by the economic interests of both the developing and developed nations. One of the leading socioeconomic aspects of toxic colonialism is capital gain and money. Jennifer Kitt states "developed countries want to save it, and developing countries want to earn it." There is little report of regard for the health concerns developing countries subject their people to as long as there is a monetary or economical gain and the developed world takes full advantage of this in order to save money, and "the wealth and income gaps between developing nations and developed nations have continually grown throughout the past century. As developing nations seek to boost economic growth, the enforcement of the few hazardous waste regulations in place often fall by the wayside. Many agencies in these developing countries do not have the resources to give approvals or enforce their regulations". Despite this, "developed countries generally have increasingly stringent environmental regulations governing the domestic disposal of hazardous wastes. When compliance costs are coupled with an increased quantity of waste and local opposition to disposal, they generally produce drastically increased disposal costs for hazardous waste." It is effective for developed countries to seek those less developed and offer them the idea of economic relief at a seemingly minor, but substantial environment cost. In some instances, monetary funds are not the only thing exchanged between developed and developing nations. For example, "Somali warring parties used to accept hazardous and highly toxic wastes in exchange of army and ammunition". The need for developed nations to remove themselves from handling excessive toxic waste commitments is also a reported driving force behind toxic colonialism.

== Progress ==
Over the past few decades there have been improvements in environmental protection that have tried to end the illegal dumping of toxic waste worldwide. The Basel Convention in 1989 was a treaty signed by 105 countries and was intended to regulate the international shipping of toxic substances. Despite the treaty, millions of tons of toxic and hazardous materials continue to move both legally and illegally from richer countries to poorer countries each year. The history of suburbanization reveals that although many forces contributed to decentralization, it has largely been an exclusionary undertaking. Semia Gharbi won the Goldman Environmental Prize in 2025 for her work preventing Italy from dumping waste in Tunisia.

In 1992 the US established the US Environmental Act in an attempt to identify areas threatened by the highest levels of toxic chemicals and ensure that groups of individuals residing within those areas have opportunities and resources to participate in public discussions concerning siting and cleanup of industrial facilities. One organization fighting toxic colonialism is the Basel Action Network (BAN). BAN is focused on confronting the impacts of global environmental injustice and economic inefficiency of toxic trade (toxic wastes, products and technologies).

== See also ==
- Ecocide
- Ecomafia
- Environmental crime
- Environmental dumping
- Environmental justice
- Environmental racism
- Global environmental inequality
- Global waste trade
- Sacrifice zone
- Pollution is Colonialism
