= Environmental racism =

Environmental injustice that occurs within a racialized context

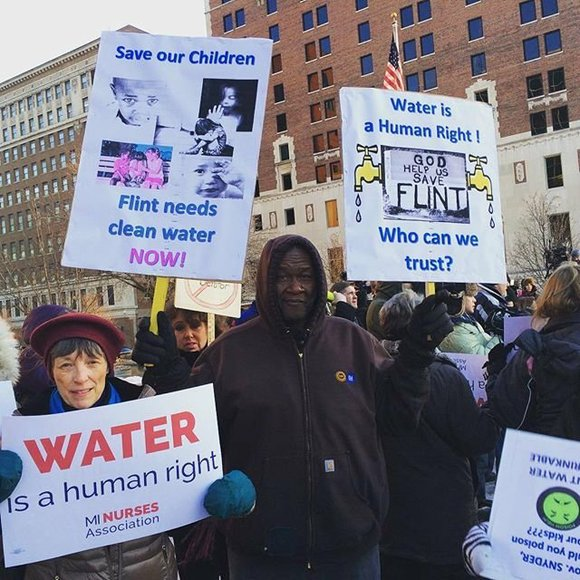
Michiganders protesting the Flint water crisis in January 2016. The crisis disproportionately affected black residents of Flint, Michigan, as well as low-income communities.

Environmental racism is the disproportionate impact of environmental hazards, pollution, and ecological degradation on marginalized communities and on people of color. Environmental racism is embedded in policy making, both domestically and internationally, and is an example of structural racism which produces health hierarchies. Environmental racism often intersects with sexism, when health inequities faced by women and gender minority groups are exacerbated by the consequences of environmental racism. In the United States, some communities are continuously polluted while the government places barriers to prevent environmental progress, a form of ecological blackmail. Many in these affected communities have little to no resources to fund lawsuits or battles regarding pollution, the spread of toxins, and encroachment. According to Robert D. Bullard, father of the environmental justice movement, environmental regulations do not equally benefit all of society; people of color (African Americans, Latinos, Asians, Pacific Islanders, and Native Americans) are disproportionately harmed by industrial toxins in their jobs and their neighborhoods.

Environmental racism may disadvantage minority groups or numerical majorities, as in South Africa where apartheid had debilitating environmental impacts on Black people. Internationally, trade in global waste disadvantages global majorities in poorer countries largely inhabited by people of color. It also applies to the particular vulnerability of indigenous groups to environmental pollution. The activism of environmental racism can be attributed to the environmental justice movement developed in the United States and globally through the late 1960s, building on the principle of “all people and communities are entitled to equal protection of environmental and public health laws and regulations.”

== History ==
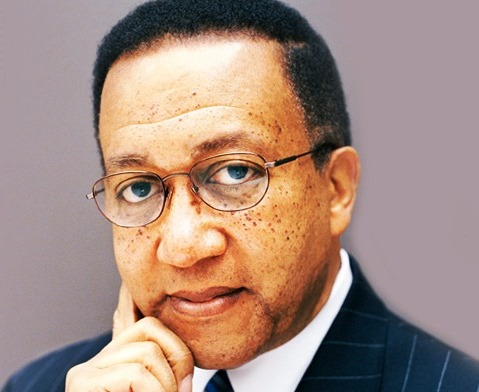
Benjamin F. Chavis Jr. coined the phrase "environmental racism".

The term "environmental racism" was coined in 1982 by Benjamin Chavis, previous executive director of the United Church of Christ (UCC) Commission for Racial Justice. In a speech opposing the placement of hazardous polychlorinated biphenyl (PCB) waste in the Warren County, North Carolina landfill, Chavis defined the term as:

Racial discrimination in environmental policy making, the enforcement of regulations and laws, the deliberate targeting of communities of color for toxic waste facilities, the official sanctioning of the life-threatening presence of poisons and pollutants in our communities, and the history of excluding people of color from leadership of the ecology movements.

Recognition of environmental racism catalyzed the environmental justice movement that began in the 1970s and 1980s with influence from the earlier civil rights movement. Grassroots organizations and campaigns brought attention to environmental racism in policy making and emphasized the importance of minority input. While environmental racism has been historically tied to the environmental justice movement, throughout the years the term has been increasingly disassociated. Following the events in Warren County, the UCC and US General Accounting Office released reports showing that hazardous waste sites were disproportionately located in poor minority neighborhoods. Chavis and Dr. Robert D. Bullard pointed out institutionalized racism stemming from government and corporate policies that led to environmental racism. These racist practices included redlining, zoning, and colorblind adaptation planning. Residents experienced environmental racism due to their low socioeconomic status, and lack of political representation and mobility. Expanding the definition in "The Legacy of American Apartheid and Environmental Racism", Dr. Bullard said that environmental racism:

Refers to any policy, practice, or directive that differentially affects or disadvantages (whether intended or unintended) individuals, groups, or communities based on race or color.

Institutional racism operates on a large scale within societal norms, policies, and procedures extending to environmental planning and decision-making, reinforcing environmental racism through government, legal, economic, and political institutions. Racism significantly increases exposure to environmental and health risks as well as access to health care.

Government agencies, including the federal Environmental Protection Agency (EPA), have often failed to protect people of color from pollution and industrial infiltrations. This failure is evident in the disproportionate pollution burden borne by communities of color, with African American and Latino neighborhoods experiencing higher levels of pollution compared to predominantly white areas. Many reactionary lawsuits against the EPA have been filed including ones filed by community-based groups in California, Michigan, Texas, Alabama, and New Mexico between 1992 and 2003. When met with neglect, the communities filed suit again in 2015 and were met with rudimentary investigations that failed to culminate in change.

For instance, in Los Angeles, over 71% of African Americans and 50% of Latinos live in areas with the most polluted air, while only 34% of the white population does. Nationally, a significant portion of whites, African Americans, and Hispanics reside in counties with substandard air quality, with people of color disproportionately affected by pollution-related health issues.

Although the term was coined in the US, environmental racism also occurs on the international level. Studies have shown that since environmental laws have become prominent in developed countries, companies have moved their waste towards the Global South. Less developed countries frequently have fewer environmental regulations and become pollution havens.

== Causes ==
Several factors lead to environmental racism: competition for affordable land, racist or dismissive attitudes towards the consequences of projects with negative environmental impacts, and the marginalized communities' lack of political power, lack of mobility, and poverty. Communities cannot effectively resist corporations' and governments' decisions which impact them, because they cannot access political power are unable to negotiate just costs. Communities with minimized socio-economic mobility cannot relocate. Lack of financial contributions also reduces the communities' ability to act both physically and politically. Chavis defined environmental racism in five categories: racial discrimination in defining environmental policies, discriminatory enforcement of regulations and laws, deliberate targeting of minority communities as hazardous waste dumping sites, official sanctioning of dangerous pollutants in minority communities, and the exclusion of people of color from environmental leadership positions.

Minority communities often do not have the financial means, resources, and political representation to oppose hazardous waste sites. Known as locally unwanted land uses (LULUs), these facilities that benefit the whole community often reduce the quality of life of minority communities. These neighborhoods also may depend on the economic opportunities the site brings and are reluctant to oppose its location at the risk of their health. Additionally, controversial projects are less likely to be sited in non-minority areas that are expected to pursue collective action and succeed in opposing the siting of the projects in their area.

In cities in the Global North, suburbanization and gentrification lead to patterns of environmental racism. For example, white flight from industrial zones for safer, cleaner, suburban locales leaves minority communities in the inner cities and in close proximity to polluted industrial zones. In these areas, unemployment is high and businesses are less likely to invest in area improvement, creating poor economic conditions for residents and reinforcing a social formation that reproduces racial inequality. Furthermore, the poverty of property owners and residents in a municipality may be taken into consideration by hazardous waste facility developers, since areas with depressed real estate values will save developers' money.

=== Socioeconomic aspects ===
Cost–benefit analysis (CBA) is a process that places a monetary value on costs and benefits to evaluate issues. Environmental CBA aims to provide policy solutions for intangible products such as clean air and water by measuring a consumer's willingness to pay for these goods. CBA can contribute to environmental racism through the valuing of environmental resources based on their utility to society. When someone is willing and able to pay more for clean water or air, their payment financially benefits society more than when people cannot pay for these goods, which can create a burden on poor communities. This can manifest through discriminatory or disproportionate siting, in which hazardous waste sites are disproportionately placed in communities with a higher percentage of low-income or minority households.

This form of economic valuation can contribute to these siting practices and further entrench environmental racism through the devaluation of property values in these communities. Economic property valuation can also contribute to environmental racism through environmental gentrification, which describes the process that can occur when the removal of decontamination or creation of green spaces in low-income and communities of color leads to higher-income, often White, populations moving to these areas. The improvement of the environmental quality of these communities, while often intended to reduce health disparities and advance environmental justice, can lead to an increase in property values that can displace previous residents.

== Fossil fuel racism ==
The impacts of fossil fuel processing are not distributed equally with communities of color and lower-income communities as opposed to white, or wealthy communities. These communities experience health hazards from air and water pollution as well as the risks from climate change. Sacrifice zones are the concept associated with these communities where systemic racism intersects with a fossil fuel-based economy. From a perspective by Energy Research & Social Science, the "fossil fuel racism" phenomenon is framed through the argument that systemic racism effectively subsidizes the fossil fuel industry by allowing it to externalize the costs of pollution onto communities of color.

Looking at pollution through the lens of fossil fuel racism allows for a shift in focus to the systems and structures that perpetuate these injustices. Alysha Khambay, a researcher with Amnesty International, notes, "Regulations are often unenforced, and many of the companies involved appear to treat any fines from regulators, if they are imposed at all, as just another cost of doing business. The current system is stacked in favor of the companies and against the people they harm. This must and can change."

== Impacts on health ==
Environmental racism impacts the health of the communities affected by poor environments. Various factors that can cause health problems include exposure to hazardous chemical toxins in landfills and rivers. Exposure to these toxins can also weaken or slow brain development.

The animal protection organization In Defense of Animals claims intensive animal agriculture negatively affects the health of nearby communities. They believe that associated manure lagoons produce hydrogen sulfide and contaminate local water supplies, leading to higher levels of miscarriages, birth defects, and disease outbreaks. These farms are disproportionately placed in low-income areas and communities of color. Other risks include exposure to pesticides, chemical run-off and particulate matter in the air. Poor cleanliness in facilities and chemical exposure may also affect agricultural workers, who are frequently people of color.

=== Pollution ===
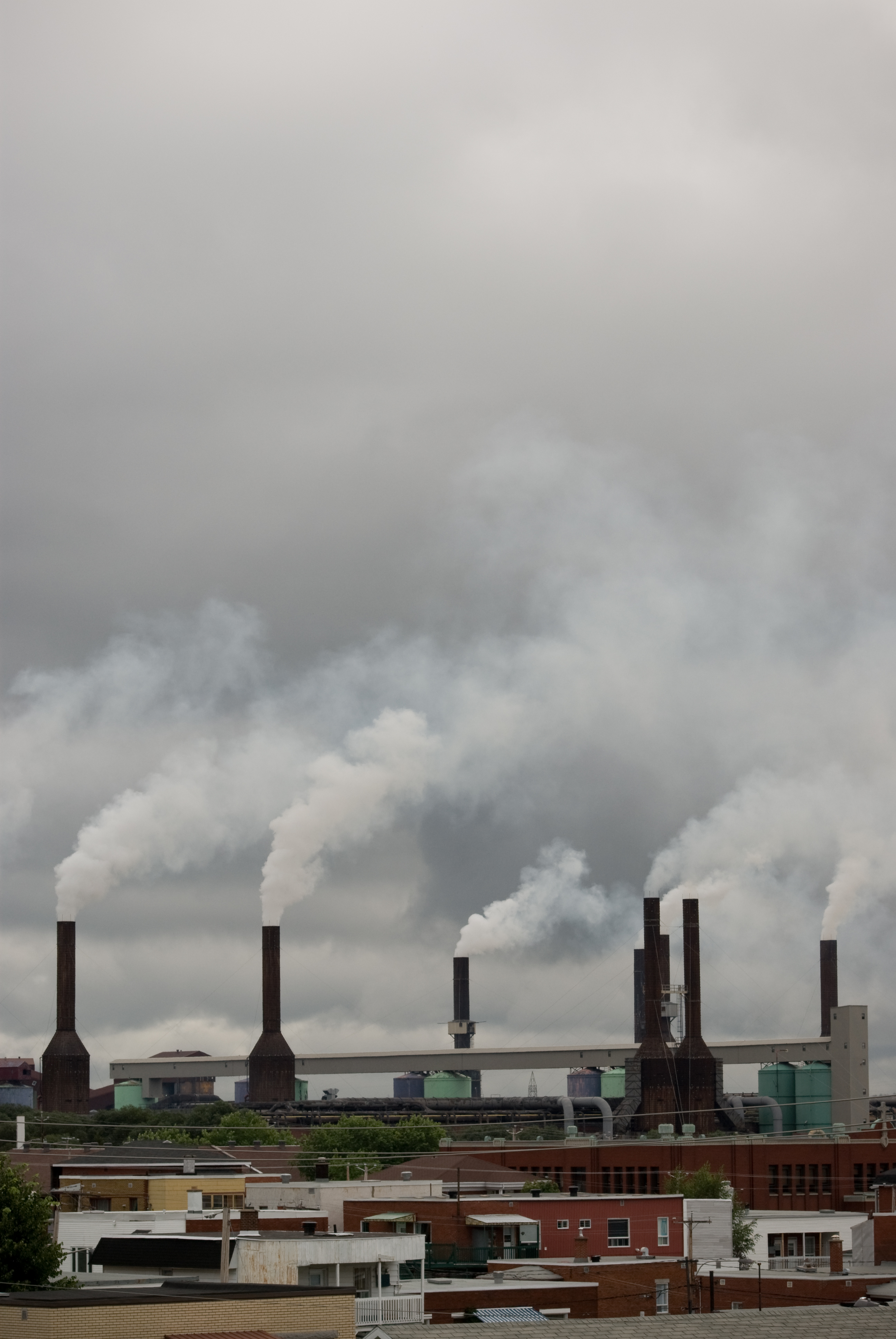
A large quantity of gases released from a factory near apartments.

Dust pollution from drilling contributes to high amounts of toxic air inhaled.

The southeastern part of the United States has experienced a large amount of pollution and minority populations have been hit with the brunt of those impacts. There are many cases of people who have died or are chronically ill from coal plants in places such as Detroit, Memphis, and Kansas City. Tennessee and West Virginia residents are frequently subject to breathing toxic ash due to blasting in the mountains for mining. Drought, flooding, the constant depletion of land and air quality determine the health and safety of the residents surrounding these areas. Communities of color and low-income status most often feel the brunt of these issues firsthand.

There are many communities around the world that face the same problems. For example, the work of Desmond D'Sa focused on communities in South Durban where high pollution industries impact people forcibly relocated during Apartheid.

Environmental racism is tied to the systemic issues of educational opportunity, socioeconomic status, and overall health for children and mothers in effected areas. Women of color are faced with larger risk for birth complications caused by chronic stress from factors largely due to Environmental racism. Exposure to contaminants, pollution, noise are hazards faced by women and children in underprivileged neighborhoods contribute to the prevalence and severity of diseases like childhood asthma and toxin exposure like lead.

Students and children in underprivileged neighborhoods due to the lack of economic stabilities and security receive lesser educational opportunities. In low income, minority areas in Los Angeles were more likely to be attending near hazardous facilities, research suggesting causing higher health risks. There have been significant ties to environmental toxicity like lead poisoning causing altered cognitive capacity. Lead has been found to cause intellectual deficits as well as physical impairments such as cardiovascular problems, blood pressure, and fertility.

Toxic chemicals in the environment deeply affect patterns of human diseases, with scientists estimating that 70 to 90 percent of risk is due to differences in the environment. This especially affects young children as the brain rapidly develops in stressful, toxic environments. It has been extensively researched that African American children are more likely to be victims of lead exposure and poisoning with a 1988 federal study finding that they were three times more likely to have experienced lead poisoning as opposed to white children.

Lead does not naturally break down in the environment, persisting in the air, soil, and water, meaning that it continuously harms those in its vicinity for years after its initial introduction. Older neighborhoods have a larger presence of lead in its construction and racism in the housing markets means that Black children are more likely to be living in substandard housing causing heightened lead exposure.

In 2014, named the Flint water crisis, 9000 children under the age of six in a primarily African American community of Flint, Michigan were victims of lead poisoning via the water supply as city officials began sourcing its water from contaminated Flint River to lower city costs. During that time the community was poisoned for 18 months, causing a 12 percent drop-in fertility rate and a 58 percent increase in fetal deaths all linked to the contaminated water.

=== Environmental racism limits improvement ===
Environmental racism intensifies existing health disparities among marginalized communities, with BIPOC individuals disproportionately bearing the burden of environmental exposures and their health consequences. Black children, for example, are still more exposed to lead than children of other racial groups contributing to higher body burdens of toxins such as lead, polychlorinated biphenyls, and phthalates.

Institutionalized racism in epidemiology and environmental health perpetuates the neglect of BIPOC experiences and contributes to the contribution of structural barriers in research funding and publication. For instance, studies on sperm health predominantly focus on White men, neglecting the reproductive health experiences of men of color despite their higher exposure to environmental toxins. This lack of inclusion in research both perpetuates health disparities and a lack of trust among BIPOC communities due to historical exploration in medical research. Structural racism within research contributes to the marginalization of BIPOC communities and limits the development of effective interventions that can address environmental health disparities.

== Growth of AI Data Centers ==
With the advancement of AI development, AI data centers within the US are being placed in rural, low-income communities, placing environmental strain on the nearby populations. AI data centers use a mass of water and energy, often used on the existing water and power infrastructures of the local communities, causing the drastic increase in costs and environmental harm. AI currently isn't strictly regulated, causing the continual growth of centers without regard to the communities affected by pollution, water and energy scarcity, and toxin proximity.

Many companies such as Google, Meta, Amazon, Microsoft, and Open AI continually challenge and lobby lawmakers and regulators to use the utility grids of local communities, with many communities not having the funds or resources to adequately fight in the realms of law.

The United States views AI development as a global competition, prioritizing reactive planning and administration creating environmental stain and often deepening inequality where low-income communities take the brunt of these quick, low regulated technologies. Within the United States AI development is being framed as critical infrastructure development, placing importance to national competitiveness that reduces and redefines the reach of local planning authorities. This allows for the zoning, permitting, and grid coordination to service the larger national competition rather than the individual communities. Communities are also being pressured by the larger state/federal government to allow the creation of these centers with the promise of job creation and tax revenue.

== Reducing environmental racism ==
Activists have called for "more participatory and citizen-centered conceptions of justice." The climate justice and environmental justice movements address environmental racism, aiming to make change so that marginalized populations are not disproportionately vulnerable to climate change and pollution. According to the United Nations Conference on Environment and Development, one possible solution is the precautionary principle, which states that "where there are threats of serious or irreversible damage, lack of full scientific certainty shall not be used as a reason for postponing cost-effective measures to prevent environmental degradation." Under this principle, the initiator of the potentially hazardous activity is charged with demonstrating the activity's safety. Environmental justice activists also emphasize the need for waste reduction in general, which would act to reduce the overall burden, as well as reduce methane emissions which in turn reduce climate change.

=== Studies ===
In wartimes, environmental racism occurs in ways that the public later learn about through reports. For example, Friends of the Earth International's Environmental Nakba report brings attention to environmental racism that has occurred in the Gaza Strip during the Israeli–Palestinian conflict. Some Israeli practices include cutting off three days of water supply to refugee Palestinians and destroying farms.

Besides studies that point out cases of environmental racism, studies have also provided information on how to go about changing regulations and preventing environmental racism from happening. In a study by Daum, Stoler and Grant on e-waste management in Accra, Ghana, the importance of engaging with different fields and organizations such as recycling firms, communities, and scrap metal traders are emphasized over adaptation strategies such as bans on burning and buy-back schemes that have not caused much effect on changing practices.

Environmental justice scholars such as Laura Pulido, Department Head of Ethnic studies and Professor at the University of Oregon, and David Pellow, Dehlsen and Department Chair of Environmental studies and Director of the Global Environmental Justice Project at the University of California, Santa Barbara, argue that recognizing environmental racism as an element stemming from the entrenched legacies of racial capitalism is crucial to the movement, with white supremacy continuing to shape human relationships with nature and labor.

=== Procedural justice ===
Current political ideologies surrounding how to make right issues of environmental racism and environmental justice are shifting towards the idea of employing procedural justice, especially in diplomatic situations. Procedural justice calls for a fair, transparent, impartial decision-making process with equal opportunity for all parties to voice their positions, opinions, and concerns. Rather than just focusing on the outcomes of agreements and the effects those outcomes have on affected populations and interest groups, procedural justice looks to involve all stakeholders throughout the process from planning through implementation. In terms of combating environmental racism, procedural justice helps to reduce the opportunities for powerful and sometimes corrupt states and private entities to dictate the entire decision-making process, and puts some power back into the hands of those who will be directly affected by the decisions being made.

=== Activism ===
Activism takes many forms. One form is collective demonstrations or protests, which can take place on a number of different levels from local to international. Additionally, in places where activists feel as though governmental solutions will work, organizations and individuals alike can pursue direct political action. In many cases, activists and organizations will form partnerships both regionally and internationally to gain more clout in pursuit of their goals.

==== Indigenous women's movements in Canada ====
There have been many resistance movements in Canada initiated by Indigenous women against environmental racism. One that was prominent and had a great impact on the movement was, The Native Women's Association of Canada's (NWAC) Sisters in Spirit Initiative. This initiative aims to create reports on the deaths and disappearances of Indigenous women to raise awareness and get government and civil society groups to take action. Though the Canadian federal government decided to defund the Sisters in Spirit Initiative in 2010, the NWAC continues to support women, Two-Spirit and LGBTQ+ Indigenous peoples in their fight to be heard. In other Indigenous resistance movements there is an emphasis on healing from trauma by focusing on spirituality and traditional practices to fight against the forces of patriarchy and racism that have caused environmental racism.

Activists and Indigenous communities have also gone through state official legal routes to voice their concerns such as discussing treaties, anti-human trafficking laws, anti-violence against women laws and UNDRIP. These have been deemed insufficient solutions by Indigenous groups and communities because there are some voices that are not heard and because the state does not respect or recognize the sovereignty of Indigenous nations.

=== Environmental reparations ===
Some scientists and economists have looked into the prospect of Environmental Reparations, or forms of payment made to individuals who, it is argued, are negatively affected by industry presence in some way. Potential groups to be impacted include individuals living in close proximity to industry, victims of natural disasters, and climate refugees who flee hazardous living conditions in their own country. Reparations can take many forms, from direct payouts to individuals, to money set aside for waste-site cleanups, to purchasing air monitors for low income residential neighborhoods, to investing in public transportation, which reduces green house gas emissions. As Robert Bullard writes,

Environmental Reparations represent a bridge to sustainability and equity... Reparations are both spiritual and environmental medicine for healing and reconciliation.

=== Policies and international agreements ===
The export of hazardous waste to third world countries is another growing concern. Between 1989 and 1994, an estimated 2,611 metric tons of hazardous waste was exported from Organization for Economic Cooperation and Development (OECD) countries to non-OECD countries. Two international agreements were passed in response to the growing exportation of hazardous waste into their borders. The Organization of African Unity (OAU) was concerned that the Basel Convention adopted in March 1989 did not include a total ban on the trans-boundary movement on hazardous waste. In response to their concerns, on January 30, 1991, the Pan-African Conference on Environmental and Sustainable Development adopted the Bamako Convention banning the import of all hazardous waste into Africa and limiting their movement within the continent. In September 1995, the G-77 nations helped amend the Basel Convention to ban the export of all hazardous waste from industrial countries (mainly OECD countries and Lichtenstein) to other countries. A resolution was signed in 1988 by the OAU which declared toxic waste dumping to be a "crime against Africa and the African people". Soon after, the Economic Community of West African States (ECOWAS) passed a resolution that allowed for penalties, such as life imprisonment, to those who were caught dumping toxic wastes.

Globalization and the increase in transnational agreements introduce possibilities for cases of environmental racism. For example, the 1994 North American Free Trade Agreement (NAFTA) attracted US-owned factories to Mexico, where toxic waste was abandoned in the Colonia Chilpancingo community and was not cleaned up until activists called for the Mexican government to clean up the waste.

Environmental justice movements have grown to become an important part of world summits. This issue is gathering attention and features a wide array of people, workers, and levels of society that are working together. Concerns about globalization can bring together a wide range of stakeholders including workers, academics, and community leaders for whom increased industrial development is a common denominator".

Many policies can be expounded based on the state of human welfare. This occurs because environmental justice is aimed at creating safe, fair, and equal opportunity for communities and to ensure things like redlining do not occur. With all of these unique elements in mind, there are serious ramifications for policy makers to consider when they make decisions.

=== United States legislation and policies ===
Relevant laws and regulations aimed to address environmental racism encompass a combination of tort law, civil rights law, and environmental law. Here's a quick breakdown of these laws:

Tort law:

This law allows individuals or communities to seek compensation for damages caused by the negligence or wrongful actions of others. In the context of environmental racism, plaintiffs can use tort law to claim compensation for health issues, property damage, or loss of quality of life due to pollution or other environmental harms.

Civil rights law:

Litigation under civil rights statutes focuses on challenging the discriminatory impact of environmental decisions and policies. Lawsuits may argue that certain actions or policies have a disparate impact on communities of color, violating their civil rights.

Environmental law:

Federal environmental statutes such as the Clean Air Act, Clean Water Act, and the National Environmental Policy Act (NEPA) provide mechanisms for challenging the adequacy of environmental reviews or compliance with regulatory standards. NEPA specifically has sought to include previously discounted populations in conversations regarding how their land is used, setting a regulatory precedent for future environmental statutes. However, environmental laws are transient, and NEPA has become highly criticized under the Trump administration, leading to edits including dropping requirements, reducing project types, and shortening timelines for reviews.

=== Current initiatives in the United States ===
Most initiatives currently focusing on environmental racism are more focused on the larger topic of environmental justice. They are at both the state and federal levels.

On the state level, local politicians focus on their communities to introduce policies that will affect them, including land use policies, improving the environmental health impacts, and involving their community in the planning processes for these policies.

Fourteen states have created offices that are specifically focused on environmental justice and advise policymakers on how their policies may impact minority populations. Maryland established their Commission on Environmental Justice and Sustainable Communities in 2001. The most recently formed councils were formed in 2022 by Vermont and Oregon.

Federally, the EPA is responsible for environmental justice initiatives including the Environmental Justice Government-to-Government Program (EJG2G). The EJG2G provides a clearer line of communication and funding between all types of governments such as state, local, and tribal to make a strong effort to steer towards a more environmentally equitable society.

In April 2023, President Biden affirmed his commitment to environmental justice by introducing the Justice40 Initiative. The Justice40 initiative is a goal to make 40 percent of federal environmental programs go into marginalized communities that have not typically been the target for such programs. This initiative includes things like the Climate and Economic Justice Screening Tool and the training for federal agencies on how to use it to identify communities who may benefit from these programs. This initiative includes several federal agencies including the U.S. Department of Agriculture, the U.S. Department of Commerce, the U.S. Department of Energy, the U.S. Environmental Protection Agency, and the U.S. Department of Housing and Urban Development. It's dedicated to community outreach by involving local governments and encouraging the community to have a say in the programs that may be implemented in their communities.

=== Potential solutions ===
Environmental racism is a crucial aspect that needs to be a part of the climate crisis conversation. Learning more about environmental racism, supporting a green economy that uplifts BIPOC communities, and making environmentalism a communal practice are approaches that can address these injustices.

Environmentalism as a communal practice emphasizes the importance of viewing environmentalism as a communal effort rather than a competition between individuals by advocating for the well-being of these marginalized communities as well as supporting efforts that address overarching themes of environmental justice. Following this, understanding environmental racism highlights the concept of environmental racism where BIPOC communities disproportionately bear the burden of pollution and environmental hazards due to discrimination in public policies and industry practice. It is also important to understand the impact of environmental racism and to push for discussions that point out disparities imposed on communities of color. Supporting a green economy is also crucial, it's import `ant to advocate for a transition to clean energy as well as uplifting BIPOC communities economically and socially. In addition, being involved within the clean energy sector for marginalized communities is another step to empowering BIPOC communities and leading in environmental protection efforts.

== Examples by region ==
=== Africa ===
==== Nigeria ====
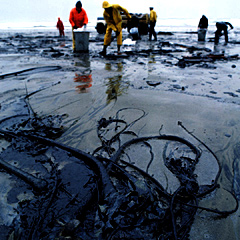
Oil spill

From 1956 to 2006, up to 1.5 million tons of oil were spilled in the Niger Delta, 50 times the volume spilled in the Exxon Valdez disaster. Indigenous people in the region have suffered the loss of their livelihoods as a result of these environmental issues, and they have received no benefits in return for enormous oil revenues extracted from their lands. Environmental conflicts have exacerbated ongoing conflict in the Niger Delta.

Burning of toxic waste and urban air pollution are problems in more developed areas.

Ogoni people, who are indigenous to Nigeria's oil-rich Delta region have protested the disastrous environmental and economic effects of Shell Oil's drilling and denounced human rights abuses by the Nigerian government and by Shell. Their international appeal intensified dramatically after the execution in 1995 of nine Ogoni activists, including Ken Saro-Wiwa, who was a founder of the nonviolent Movement for the Survival of the Ogoni People (MOSOP).

==== South Africa ====
The negative impacts the mining industry has on community and individual health has been studied and well-documented by a number of organizations worldwide. Health implications of living in proximity to mining operations include pregnancy complications, mental health issues, various forms of cancer, and many more. During the Apartheid period in South Africa, the mining industry grew rapidly as a result of the lack of environmental regulation. Mining corporations usually operate in communities with high rates of poverty and unemployment. Within these communities, citizens are often divided on the issue of whether the pros of mining in terms of economic opportunity outweigh the cons in terms of the health of the people in the community. Mining companies often try to use these disagreements to their advantage by magnifying this conflict. Additionally, mining companies in South Africa have close ties with the national government, skewing the balance of power in their favor while simultaneously excluding local people from many decision-making processes. This legacy of exclusion has had lasting effects in the form of impoverished South Africans bearing the brunt of ecological impacts resulting from the actions of, for example, mining companies. Some argue that to effectively fight environmental racism and achieve some semblance of justice, there must also be a reckoning with the factors that form situations of environmental racism such as rooted and institutionalized mechanisms of power, social relations, and cultural elements.

The term "energy poverty" is used to refer to "a lack of access to adequate, reliable, affordable and clean energy carriers and technologies for meeting energy service needs for cooking and those activities enabled by electricity to support economic and human development". Numerous communities in South Africa face some sort of energy poverty. South African women are typically in charge of taking care of both the home and the community as a whole. Those in economically impoverished areas not only have to take on this responsibility, but there are numerous other challenges they face. Discrimination on the basis of gender, race, and class are all still present in South African culture. Because of this, women, who are the primary users of public resources in their work at home and for the community, are often excluded from any decision-making about control and access to public resources. The resulting energy poverty forces women to use sources of energy that are expensive and may be harmful both to their own health and that of the environment. Consequently, several renewable energy initiatives have emerged in South Africa specifically targeting these communities and women to correct this situation.

==== Ghana ====
According to Njoku, Agbalenyo, Laude, et al. who wrote "Environmental Injustice and Electronic Waste in Ghana: Challenges and Recommendations," "as per the United Nations, an estimated 57.4 million metric tons of e-waste were generated worldwide in 2021…". The areas where waste is dumped are essentially "sacrifice zones," places where the population faces extreme environmental harm due to pollution, exposure to toxins, and damaged ecosystems. Normally, this happens to marginalized groups. "The influx of hazardous waste from the prosperous 'Global North' to the impoverished 'Global South' has been called "toxic colonialism", as it stems from the long history of colonization and imperialism from the Western countries.

"While Africa generates the least of this waste, the continent has been the dumping ground for e-waste from the developed world". "E-waste collected for recycling in developed countries is often illegally sorted or disposed of in the developing world, including Ghana". According to "Environmental Injustice and Electronic Waste in Ghana: Challenges and Recommendations," in 2019, "Ghana and Nigeria alone received 77% of the e-waste from England and Wales".

The Agbogbloshie e-waste site in Ghana has recently gained a lot of attention. The e-waste site in Accra known as Agbogbloshie has become infamous worldwide. It is "one of the largest and most toxic e-waste dumps on the planet". "Broken computers, phones, and other electronic devices are shipped here, often illegally, under the guise of "second-hand goods." or "home-used goods." Once they arrive, they are dismantled and burned to retrieve valuable metals, releasing a cocktail of toxic chemicals into the air, soil, and water… and while this activity provides a meager livelihood for the impoverished, it [takes] an enormous toll on the environment, public health, and Ghana's reputation". While the burning takes place, "heavy metals like lead, mercury, and cadmium, as well as dioxins and polycyclic aromatic hydrocarbons (PAHs)" are released into the air.

It is said that Ghana has taken in millions of tons of e-waste on a yearly basis compared to Lagos and Nigeria which is estimated to take in 18,300–60,000 MT. This has led to environmental health disparities and highlights the concern of environmental justice. According to Njoku, Agbalenyo, Laude, et al., Agbogbloshie "was demolished by the government in Ghana in July 2021, [however,] several new informal e-waste recycling sites similar to the abolished Agbogbloshie are appearing throughout Accra and nearby cities," and it is challenging to control these e-waste sites because these third-world nations often struggle to find their independence and "do not have the resources to reject importations or manage electronic waste effectively".

=== Asia ===
==== China ====
From the mid-1990s until about 2001, it is estimated that some 50 to 80 percent of the electronics collected for recycling in the western half of the United States was being exported for dismantling overseas, predominantly to China and Southeast Asia. This scrap processing is quite profitable and preferred due to an abundant workforce, cheap labour, and lax environmental laws.

Guiyu, China, is one of the largest recycling sites for e-waste, where heaps of discarded computer parts rise near the riverbanks and compounds, such as cadmium, copper, lead, PBDEs, contaminate the local water supply. Water samples taken by the Basel Action Network in 2001 from the Lianjiang River contained lead levels 190 times higher than WHO safety standards. Despite contaminated drinking water, residents continue to use contaminated water over expensive trucked-in supplies of drinking water. Nearly 80 percent of children in the e-waste hub of Guiyu, China, suffer from lead poisoning, according to recent reports. Before being used as the destination of electronic waste, most of Guiyu was composed of small farmers who made their living in the agriculture business. However, farming has been abandoned for more lucrative work in scrap electronics. "According to the Western press and both Chinese university and NGO researchers, conditions in these workers' rural villages are so poor that even the primitive electronic scrap industry in Guiyu offers an improvement in income".

Researchers have found that as rates of hazardous air pollution increase in China, the public has mobilized to implement measures to curb detrimental impacts. Areas with ethnic minorities and western regions of the country tend to carry disproportionate environmental burdens.

==== India ====
Bhopal, India

Union Carbide Corporation is the parent company of Union Carbide India Limited which outsources its production to an outside country. Located in Bhopal, India, Union Carbide India Limited primarily produced the chemical methyl isocyanate used for pesticide manufacture. On December 3, 1984, a cloud of methyl isocyanate leaked as a result of the toxic chemical mixing with water in the plant in Bhopal. Approximately 520,000 people were exposed to the toxic chemical immediately after the leak. Within the first 3 days after the leak an estimated 8,000 people living within the vicinity of the plant died from exposure to the methyl isocyanate. Some people survived the initial leak from the factory, but due to improper care and improper diagnoses many have died.

As a consequence of improper diagnoses, treatment may have been ineffective and this was precipitated by Union Carbide refusing to release all the details regarding the leaked gases and lying about certain important information. The delay in supplying medical aid to the victims of the chemical leak made the situation for the survivors even worse. Many today are still experiencing the negative health impacts of the methyl isocyanate leak, such as lung fibrosis, impaired vision, tuberculosis, neurological disorders, and severe body pains.

The operations and maintenance of the factory in Bhopal contributed to the hazardous chemical leak. The storage of huge volumes of methyl isocyanate in a densely inhabited area, was in contravention with company policies strictly practiced in other plants. The company ignored protests that they were holding too much of the dangerous chemical for one plant and built large tanks to hold it in a crowded community. Methyl isocyanate must be stored at extremely low temperatures, but the company cut expenses to the air conditioning system leading to less than optimal conditions for the chemical. Additionally, Union Carbide India Limited never created disaster management plans for the surrounding community around the factory in the event of a leak or spill. State authorities were in the pocket of the company and therefore did not pay attention to company practices or implementation of the law. The company also cut down on preventive maintenance staff to save money.

==== Russia ====
Environmental racism is a form of institutional racism, which has led to the disproportionate disposal of hazardous waste in communities of colour in Russia. It also results in indigenous people disproportionately bearing the environmental burdens of mining, and oil or gas extraction. In Russia, there are 47 officially recognized indigenous groups, who have had some rights to consultation and participation under Russian law since 1999. However, these guarantees have steadily eroded with the re-centralization of state control, and several indigenous autonomous territories have been abolished since the 1990s.

Russia, an International Labor Organization member, has not ratified ILO 69, an agreement that explicitly asserts the right to self-determination for all indigenous peoples. This allows the Russian Federation to continue to deny Indigenous peoples' control over their land and resources. Russia is also a member of the United Nations, which recognizes indigenous peoples of classically colonized lands, but is somewhat vague about indigenous minorities who are not separated from their colonizers by an ocean. This is one of the arguments Russia uses to justify not complying with UN treaties in the case of the indigenous peoples of Siberia.

Environmental racism in Russia also affects Romani people and migrant workers.

=== Europe ===
==== Eastern Europe ====
Predominantly living in Central and Eastern Europe, with pockets of communities in the Americas and Middle East, the ethnic Romani people have been subjected to environmental exclusion. Often referred to as gypsies or the gypsy threat, the Romani people of Eastern Europe mostly live under the poverty line in shanty towns or slums. Facing issues such as long term exposure to harmful toxins given their locations to waste dumps and industrial plants, along with being refused environmental assistance like clean water and sanitation, the Romani people have been facing racism via environmental means. Many countries such has Romania, Bulgaria and Hungary have tried to implement environmental protection initiatives across their respected countries; however, most have failed due to "addressing the conditions of Roma communities have been framed through an ethnic lens as "Roma issues". Only recently has some form of environmental justice for the Romani people come to light. Seeking environmental justice in Europe, the Environmental Justice Program is now working with human rights organizations to help fight environmental racism.

In the "Discrimination in the EU in 2009" report, conducted by the European Commission, "64% of citizens with Roma friends believe discrimination is widespread, compared to 61% of citizens without Roma friends."

==== France ====
Exporting toxic wastes to countries in the Global South is one form of environmental racism that occurs on an international basis. In one alleged instance, in 2006, the French aircraft carrier Clemenceau was prohibited from entering Alang, an Indian ship-breaking yard, due to a lack of clear documentation about its toxic contents. French President Jacques Chirac ultimately ordered the carrier, which contained tons of hazardous materials including asbestos and PCBs, to return to France.

==== United Kingdom ====
In the UK environmental racism (or also climate racism) has been called out by multiple action groups such as the Wretched of the Earth call out letter in 2015 and Black Lives Matter in 2016.

=== North America ===
==== Black people in North America ====
Black people in Canada and the United States also face the harsh realities of environmental racism. In Canada, "most African-Nova Scotian live in historical African-Nova Scotian communities which are rural communities and many are near landfills". The town of Shelburne, Nova Scotia, made the list as one individual stated that "environmental racism is killing us". "[Shelburne] once had the highest population of freed Black people in Canada". However, they were never treated equally to their white counterparts, a reality that still occurs to this day. According to Donovan's article, the town "saw trash [being] dumped and burned for nearly eight decades". As a result, "the community continues to deal with water contamination issues and higher rates of cancer than white residents in other parts of town".

Similarly, in the United States, "in the fall of 1982, more than 500 people were arrested while protesting the creation of a toxic landfill in Warren County, in the U.S. state of North Carolina". "[The] plan [was] to build a toxic landfill in the rural community of Afton (Warren County) to store 60,000 tons of soil laced with cancer-causing polychlorinated biphenyls (PCBs) that had been dumped illegally on 240 miles of North Carolina roadways earlier that summer". Even after the arrests and protests, "the state still dumped contaminated soil into a community whose population was 60% Black". This particular "site was chosen in a mostly Black, low-income area, prompting the Washington Post to describe the protests as "the marriage of environmentalism with civil rights." The event sparked national attention and introduced the term "environmental racism". In the 1970s, Houston, Texas faced a similar controversy when the city tried to build a landfill in the 82.4% Black Northwood Manor neighborhood. At the time, "5 out of 5 city-owned landfills (100 percent) and 6 of the 8 city-owned incinerators (75 percent) were sited in Black neighborhoods," even though Black people made up just 1/4 of the Houston population.

Neighbors formed the Northeast Community Action Group and sued the city to halt construction of the landfill, but "The federal district judge in Houston ruled against the residents and the landfill was built." Despite the loss, the city of Houston passed "a resolution in 1980 that prohibited city-owned trucks carrying solid waste from dumping at the controversial landfill" and "an ordinance restricting the construction of solid-waste sites near public facilities such as schools."

==== Canada ====
See more: Environmental racism in Nova Scotia

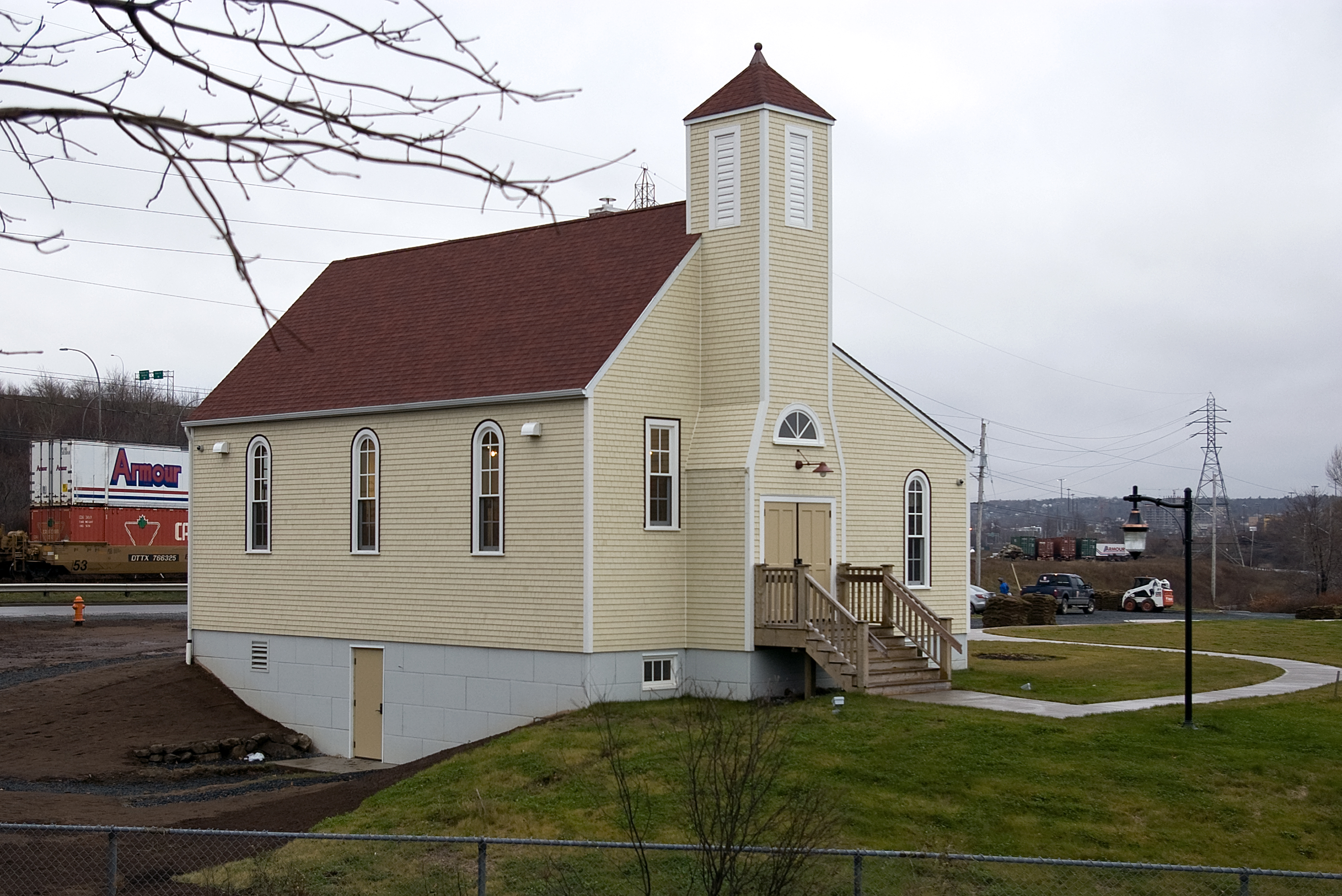
The reconstructed Africville Church in Nova Scotia.

In Canada, progress is being made to address environmental racism (especially in Nova Scotia's Africville community) with the passing of Bill 111 and Bill C-226, An Act to Address Environmental Racism, in the Nova Scotia Legislature. Africville, a Black community in Halifax, was destroyed in the 1960s under the guise of urban renewal after decades of systemic neglect and environmental harm, including the placement of an open dump, infectious disease hospital, and heavy industry nearby. Despite legislative progress, environmental racism continues to affect communities of colour in Nova Scotia and across Canada. In Shelburne, a historically Black community, residents have documented ongoing health concerns linked to proximity to a former toxic waste dump. The Nova Scotia NDP has criticized government delays in implementing recommendations to address environmental racism in the province.

Indigenous communities such as the Aamjiwnaang First Nation also continue to be harmed by pollution from the Canadian chemical industry centered in Southeast Ontario. Forty percent of Canada's petrochemical industry is packed into a 15-square mile radius of Sarnia, Ontario. Immediately south of the petrochemical plants is the Aamjiwnaang reservation with a population of 850 Aamjiwnaang First Nation members. Since 2002, coalitions of Indigenous individuals have fought the disproportionate concentration of pollution in their neighborhood.

Environmental racism disproportionately affects women, particularly Indigenous women and women of color, including Black, South Asian, and other racialized immigrant communities. Many low-income South Asian and racialized immigrant populations in urban centers such as Toronto, Vancouver, and Montreal face heightened exposure to air pollution, lack of access to green spaces, and proximity to industrial hazards due to systemic housing discrimination and economic marginalization. These environmental harms result in gendered health impacts, including increased rates of asthma, reproductive health issues, and cancer, disproportionately affecting women and children in these communities These patterns of injustice are rooted in Canada's colonial history and ongoing structural racism, echoing global dynamics of climate colonialism and environmental racism identified by scholars and human rights advocates. In Indigenous communities like Grassy Narrows in Northern Ontario, residents continue to experience multigenerational health effects from mercury contamination in local waterways dating back to the 1960s.

The environmental racism within Western countries is often overlooked, however, it does occur and disproportionately affects Indigenous communities throughout Canada, especially Nova Scotia.

The 2019 documentary directed by Page and Daniel, There's Something in the Water, focuses on the environmental racism in Nova Scotia, directly pulling from the experiences of Indigenous communities in the province. The community of Pictou Landing has endured a "toxic legacy of government neglect," and a long history with pollution. "The Canadian state allowed a polluting facility to operate on Indigenous land, violating Mi'kmaq treaty rights and ignoring their repeated objections". "The current fight of the Mi'kmaq people here is reflective of a long line of struggles between Indigenous communities and the government since the colonization of present day Canada".

According to Donovan's article, "a pulp mill's effluent pond was situated in Pictou Landing First Nation's backyard, polluting a crucial tidal estuary for the community". As stated in the 2019 documentary by Page and Daniel, for over 50 years, the Mi'kmaq people have been dealing with environmental disasters which have been a daily concern for the present and future generations. In 1965, the Scott Paper Company had wanted to build a pulp and paper mill in Nova Scotia and wanted it in the town of Pictou. The waste of the mill would be pipped under Pictou harbour and dumped into Boat harbour, eventually the industrial waste would make its way into the ocean. The government agreed to look after the waste from the mill and began buying up land from the area, the only problem was the "Indians" who lived on the edge of Boat harbour. The water authorities approached the chief to convince them and said nothing would go wrong and that it would be safe. The Indigenous community signed away their rights to Boat harbour and were given $65,000. Two years later the plant was in operation and the waste started to flow into Boat harbour. The fish started to die within a few days. It killed everything. Since then, the treatment facility at Simpson's Lane has been there since 1967 and the smell is horrendous and Indigenous community of Pictou continues to smell it.

In 2014, tensions came to a head when the mill's pipe broke spilling 47 million litres of toxic untreated effluent in the air, in an area known for being Mi'kmaq burial grounds. The government had pledged to close Boat harbour several times but never kept their word, therefore, the community sprung into action. The compromise was not to shut down the mill but rather the Boat harbour treatment facility. The government of Nova Scotia passed the Boat harbour Act, the law that ordered that by January 31, 2020, "the use of the Facility for the reception and treatment of effluent from the Mill must cease." Northern Pulp Nova Scotia Corporation was given 5 years to come up with an alternative but 4 years later their best plan that they could propose was to build a new pipeline that would dump the effluent into the Northumberland Strait right next to Pictou landing. Lucrative fishing grounds for both the Native and non-native communities. This plan created public outrage. If or when the waste and water stops flowing, an intensive clean up process is needed, estimated to take up to 5 years and cost over $200 million dollars to remove toxins like mercury from Boat habour.

Another example from Page and Daniel's documentary is in the town of Stewiacke, Nova Scotia where the AltaGas Corporation proposed to build an underground storage facility on unceded Mi'kmaq territory. The company had discovered underground salt caverns under the Shubenacadie river that could store gas. They planned on dissolving the cavern's salt deposits with river water and dumping that salt water mixture back into the river with up to 3,000 tons per day. The salt concentration was to contain six times the level than what was considered safe for fish to survive. Due to this, the "water protectors," Mi'kmaq women, were arrested for protesting against the underground storage facility.

==== Mexico ====
The Cucapá are a group of indigenous people that live near the U.S.-Mexico border, mainly in Mexico but some in Arizona as well. For many generations, fishing on the Colorado River was the Cucapá's main means of subsistence. In 1944, the United States and Mexico signed a treaty that effectively awarded the United States rights to about 90% of the water in the Colorado River, leaving Mexico with the remaining 10%. Over the last few decades, the Colorado River has mostly dried up south of the border, presenting many challenges for people such as the Cucapá. Shaylih Meuhlmann, author of the ethnography Where the River Ends: Contested Indigeneity in the Mexican Colorado Delta, gives a first-hand account of the situation from Meuhlmann's point of view as well as many accounts from the Cucapá themselves. In addition to the Mexican portion of the Colorado River being left with a small fraction of the overall available water, the Cucapá are stripped of the right to fish on the river, the act being made illegal by the Mexican government in the interest of preserving the river's ecological health. The Cucapá are, thus, living without access to sufficient natural sources of freshwater as well as without their usual means of subsistence. The conclusion drawn in many such cases is that the negotiated water rights under the US-Mexican treaty that lead to the massive disparity in water allotments between the two countries boils down to environmental racism.

1,900 maquiladoras are found near the US-Mexico border. Maquiladoras are companies that are usually owned by foreign entities and import raw materials, pay workers in Mexico to assemble them, and ship the finish products overseas to be sold. While Maquiladoras provide jobs, they often pay very little. These plants also bring pollution to rural Mexican towns, creating health impacts for the poor families that live nearby.

In Mexico, industrial extraction of oil, mining, and gas, as well as the mass removal of slowly renewable resources such as aquatic life, forests, and crops. Legally, the state owns natural resources but is able to grant concessions to industry through the form of taxes paid. In recent decades, a shift towards refocusing these tax dollars accumulated on the communities most impacted by the health, social, and economic impacts of extractivism has taken place. However, many indigenous and rural community leaders argue that they ought to consent to companies extracting and polluting their resources, rather than be paid reparations after the fact.

==== United States ====
Kamala Harris speaking about environmental justice in June 2020.

A US Government Accountability Office study, completed in response to the 1982 protests of the PCB landfill in Warren County, was among the first studies that drew correlations between the racial and economic background of communities and the location of hazardous waste facilities. Nevertheless, the study was limited in scope by focusing only on off-site hazardous waste landfills in the Southeastern United States.

In response to this limitation, in 1987, the United Church of Christ Commission for Racial Justice (CRJ) directed a comprehensive national study on demographic patterns associated with the location of hazardous waste sites. The CRJ national study conducted two examinations of areas surrounding commercial hazardous waste facilities and the location of uncontrolled toxic waste sites. The first study examined the association between race and socio-economic status and the location of commercial hazardous waste treatment, storage, and disposal facilities. After statistical analysis, the first study concluded that "the percentage of community residents that belonged to a racial or ethnic group was a stronger predictor of the level of commercial hazardous waste activity than was household income, the value of the homes, the number of uncontrolled waste sites, or the estimated amount of hazardous wastes generated by industry". A second study examined the presence of uncontrolled toxic waste sites in ethnic and racial minority communities and found that three of every five African and Hispanic Americans lived in communities with uncontrolled waste sites. A separate 1991 study found race to be the most influential variable in predicting where waste facilities were located.

In 1994, President Bill Clinton's issued Executive Order 12898 which directed agencies to develop a strategy to manage environmental justice. In 2002, Faber and Krieg found a correlation between higher air pollution exposure and low performance in schools and found that 92% of children at five Los Angeles public schools with the poorest air quality were of a minority background disproportionate to Los Angeles' then 70% minority population.

As a result of the placement of hazardous waste facilities, minority populations experience greater exposure to harmful chemicals and suffer from health outcomes that affect their ability at work and in schools. A comprehensive study of particulate emissions across the United States, published in 2018, found that Black people were exposed to 54% more particulate matter emissions (soot) than the average American. In a study that analyzed exposure to air pollution from vehicles in the American Mid-Atlantic and American North-East, it was found that African Americans were exposed to 61% more particulate matter than whites, with Latinos exposed to 75% more and Asians exposed to 73% more. Overall, minorities experienced 66% more pollution exposure from particulate matter than the white population. Similar patterns of environmental injustice have been observed with urban heat. A 2023 study found that historically redlined and low-income Black neighborhoods are disproportionately exposed to extreme heat, and that these hotter areas also tend to experience elevated violent crime rates—highlighting how environmental and social stressors often compound in structurally disadvantaged communities.

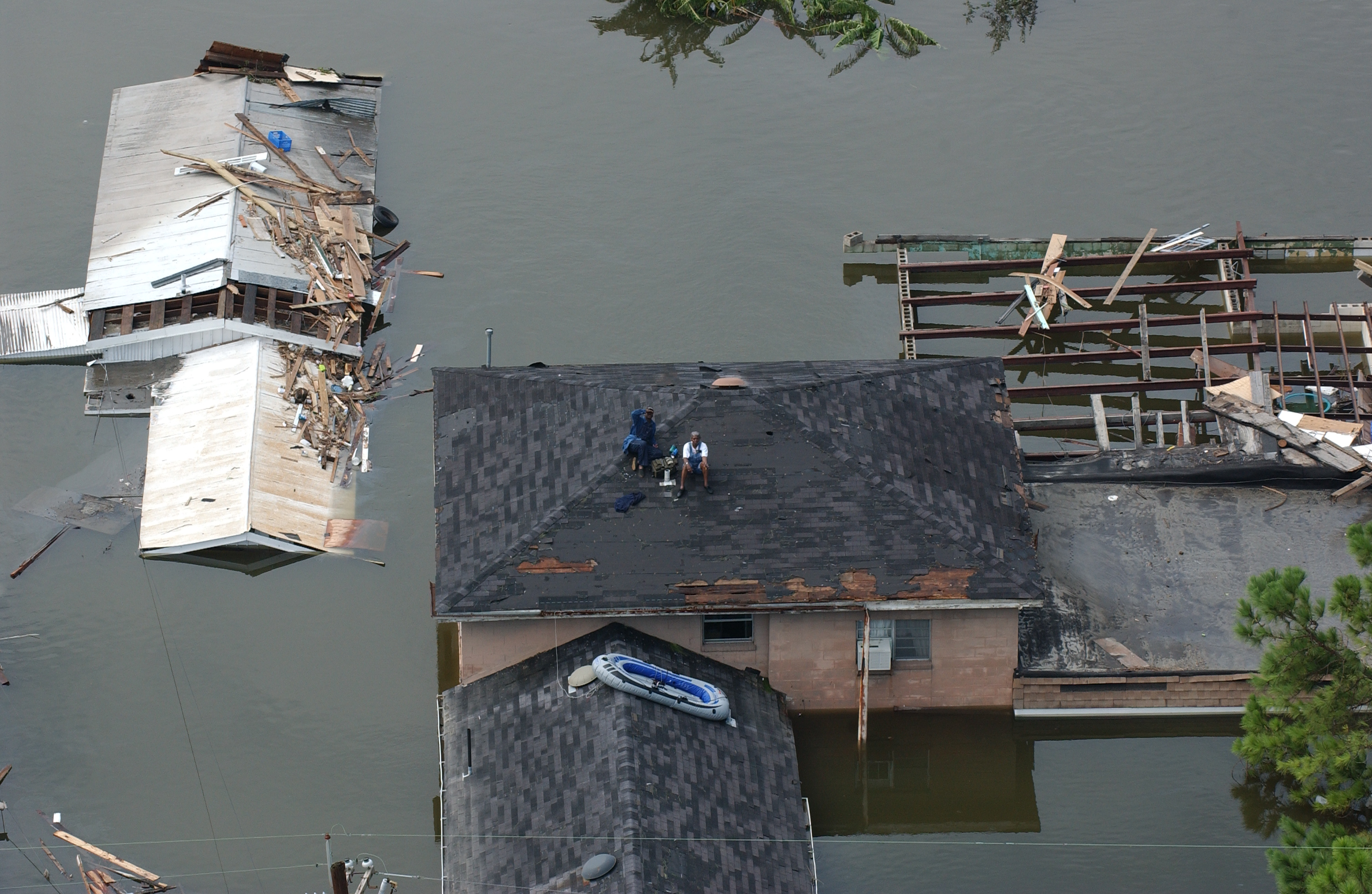
People on the roofs of their houses avoiding the flood after Hurricane Katrina.

Carl Zimring states that environmental racism is often engrained in day-to-day work and living conditions. Examples cited of environmental racism in the US include the Dakota Access Pipeline (where a portion of the proposed 1,172-mile pipeline would pass near to the Standing Rock Indian Reservation), the Flint water crisis (which affected a town that was 55% African American), Cancer Alley (Louisiana), as well as the government response to hurricane Katrina (where a mandatory evacuation was not ordered in the majority-Black city of New Orleans until 20 hours before Hurricane Katrina made landfall).

Overall, the US has worked to reduce environmental racism with municipality changes. These policies help develop further change. Some cities and counties have taken advantage of environmental justice policies and applied it to the public health sector.

===== Native American peoples =====
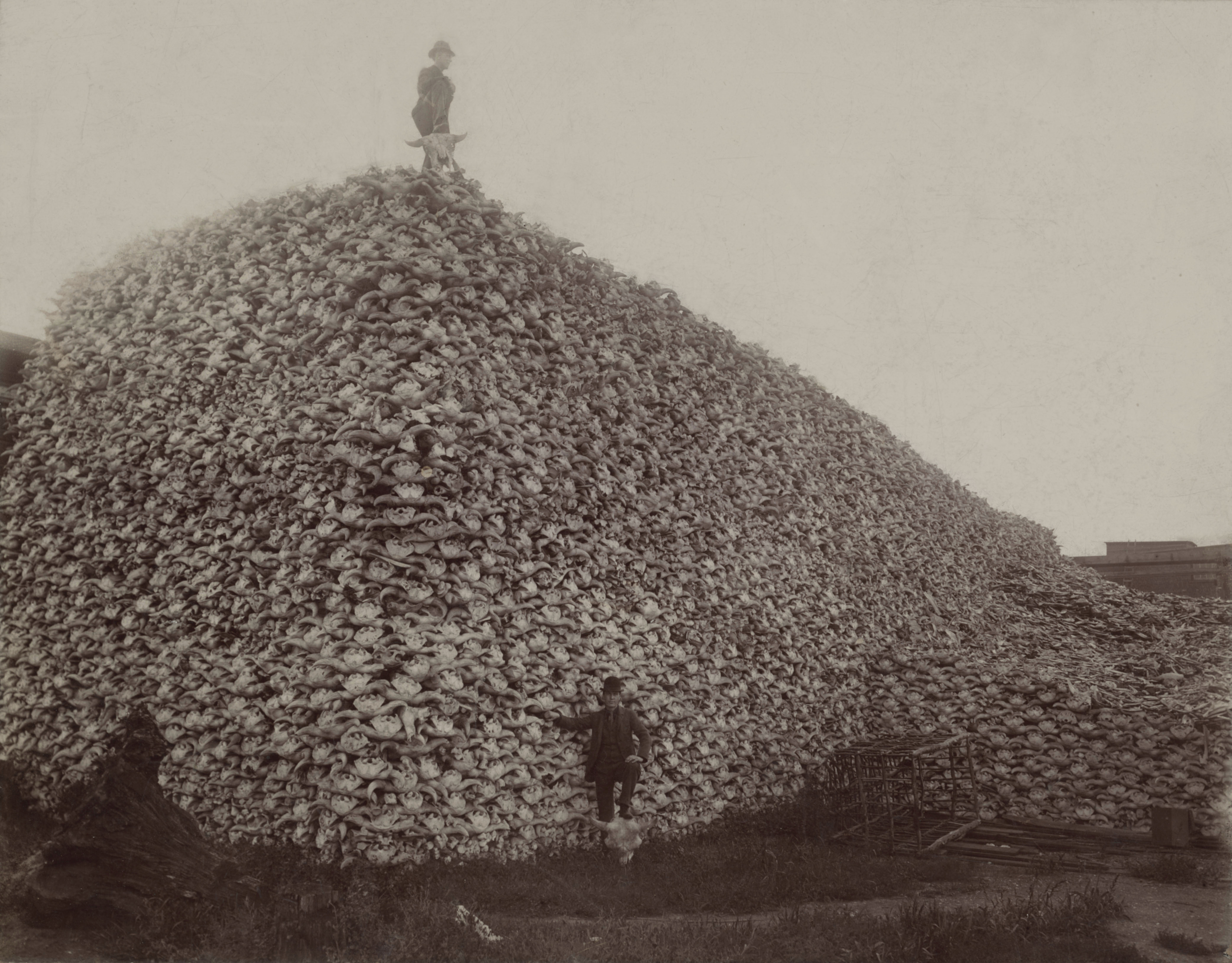
Photograph from 1892 of a pile of American bison skulls in Detroit, Michigan, waiting to be ground for fertilizer or charcoal. The United States Army encouraged massive hunts of American bison to force Native Americans off their traditional lands and into reservations farther west. That is considered an early example of environmental racism.

Native scholars have discussed whether the concept of Environmental Justice make sense in the context of Native Americans and settler colonialism. This is because Native Americans' legal status differs from other marginalized peoples in the United States. As such, Colville scholar Dina Gilio-Whitaker explains that "because Indigenous peoples' relationships to the state (i.e. the United States) are different than those of ethnic minorities, environmental justice must exceed equality and be able to live up to the concepts of tribal sovereignty, treaty rights, and government-to-government relationships."

Gilio-Whitaker further argues that the distributive justice model on which environmental racism is based is not helpful to Native communities: "Frameworks for EJ in non-Native communities that rely on distributive justice are built on capitalistic American values of land as commodity — i.e. private property — on lands that were expropriated from Native peoples." In contrast, Native peoples have very different relationships to land beyond the modes of land as commodity.

Indigenous studies scholars have argued that environmental racism, however, began in the United States with the arrival of settler colonialism.

Potawatomi philosopher Kyle Powys Whyte and Lower Brule Sioux historian Nick Estes explain that Native peoples have already lived through one environmental apocalypse, the coming of colonialism. Métis geographer Zoe Todd and academic Heather Davis have also argued that settler colonialism is "responsible for contemporary environmental crisis." In that way, it has been shown that climate change has been weaponized against Indigenous American peoples, as Founding Fathers such as Thomas Jefferson and Benjamin Franklin deforested the Americas and welcomed warmer weather, which they thought would displace Native peoples and enrich the United States. Thus, "the United States, from its birth, played a key role in causing catastrophic environmental change." Whyte explains further that "Anthropogenic (human-caused) climate change is an intensification of environmental change imposed on Indigenous peoples by colonialism."

Anishinaabe scholar Leanne Betasamosake Simpson has also argued, "We should be thinking of climate change as part of a much longer series of ecological catastrophes caused by colonialism and accumulation-based society."

The Indian Removal Act of 1830 and the Trail of Tears may also be considered early examples of environmental racism in the United States. As a result of the former, by 1850, all tribes east of the Mississippi had been removed to western lands and essentially confined them to "lands that were too dry, remote, or barren to attract the attention of settlers and corporations." During World War II, military facilities were often located conterminous to Indian reservations, which led to a situation in which "a disproportionate number of the most dangerous military facilities are located near Native American lands." A study analyzing the approximately 3,100 counties in the Continental United States found that Native American lands are positively associated with the count of sites with unexploded ordnance deemed extremely dangerous. The study also found that the risk assessment code (RAC), which is used to measure dangerousness of sites with unexploded ordnance, can sometimes conceal how much of a threat these sites are to Native Americans. The hazard probability, or probability that a hazard will harm people or ecosystems, is sensitive to the proximity of public buildings such as schools and hospitals. Those parameters neglect elements of tribal life such as subsistence consumption, ceremonial use of plants and animals, and low population densities.

Because those tribal-unique factors are not considered, Native American lands can often receive low-risk scores, despite threats to their way of life. The hazard probability does not take Native Americans into account when considering the people or ecosystems that could be harmed. Locating military facilities coterminous to reservations lead to a situation in which "a disproportionate number of the most dangerous military facilities are located near Native American lands."

More recently, Native American lands have been used for waste disposal and illegal dumping by the US and multinational corporations. The International Tribunal of Indigenous People and Oppressed Nations, convened in 1992 to examine the history of criminal activity against indigenous groups in the United States, and published a Significant Bill of Particulars outlining grievances indigenous peoples had with the US. This included allegations that the US "deliberately and systematically permitted, aided, and abetted, solicited and conspired to commit the dumping, transportation, and location of nuclear, toxic, medical, and otherwise hazardous waste materials on Native American territories in North America and has thus created a clear and present danger to the health, safety, and physical and mental well-being of Native American People."

=== Oceania ===
==== Australia ====
The Australian Environmental Justice (AEJ) is a multidisciplinary organization which is closely partnered with Friends of the Earth Australia (FoEA). The AEJ focuses on recording and remedying the effects of environmental injustice throughout Australia. The AEJ has addressed issues which include "production and spread of toxic wastes, pollution of water, soil and air, erosion and ecological damage of landscapes, water systems, plants and animals". The project looks for environmental injustices that disproportionately affect a group of people or impact them in a way they did not agree to.

The Western Oil Refinery started operating in Bellevue, Western Australia, in 1954. It was permitted rights to operate in Bellevue by the Australian government to refine cheap and localized oil. In the decades following, many residents of Bellevue claimed they felt respiratory burning due to the inhalation of toxic chemicals and nauseating fumes. Lee Bell from Curtin University and Mariann Lloyd-Smith from the National Toxic Network in Australia stated in their article, "Toxic Disputes and the Rise of Environmental Justice in Australia" that "residents living close to the site discovered chemical contamination in the ground-water surfacing in their back yards". Under immense civilian pressure, the Western Oil Refinery (now named Omex) stopped refining oil in 1979. Years later, citizens of Bellevue formed the Bellevue Action Group (BAG) and called for the government to give aid towards the remediation of the site. The government agreed and $6.9 million was allocated to clean up the site. Remediation of site began in April 2000.

==== Papua New Guinea ====
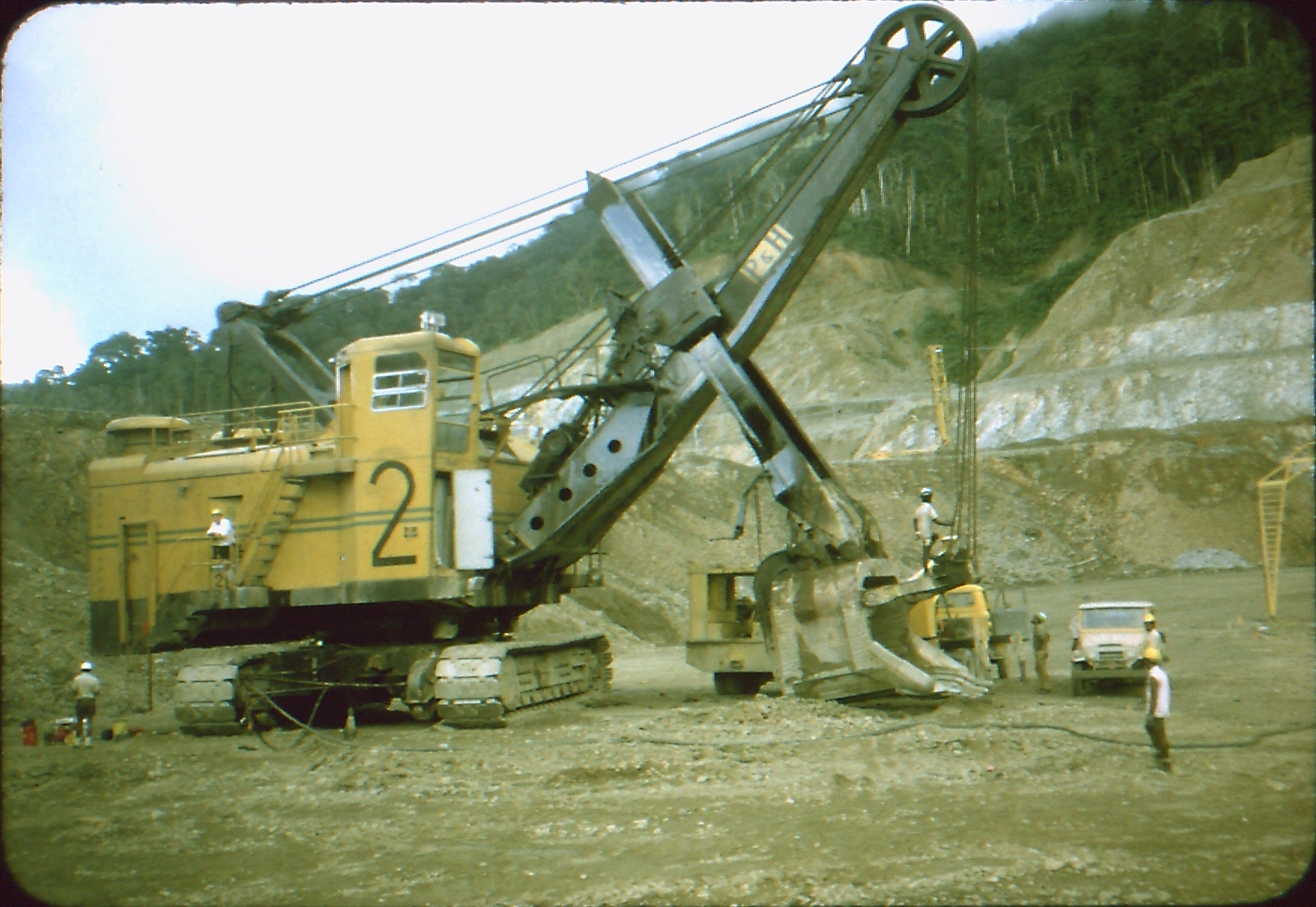
Panguna copper mine under construction, 1971.

Starting production in 1972, the Panguna mine in Papua New Guinea has been a source of environmental racism. Although closed since 1989 due to conflict on the island, the indigenous peoples (Bougainvillean) have suffered both economically and environmentally from the creation of the mine. Terrance Wesley-Smith and Eugene Ogan, University of Hawaii and University of Minnesota respectively, stated that the Bougainvillean's "were grossly disadvantaged from the beginning and no subsequent renegotiation has been able to remedy the situation".

These indigenous people faced issues such as losing land which could have been used for agricultural practices for the Dapera and Moroni villages, undervalued payment for the land, poor relocation housing for displaced villagers and significant environmental degradation in the surrounding areas.

=== South America ===
==== The Andes ====
Extracitivism, or the process of humans removing natural, raw resources from land to be used in product manufacturing, can have detrimental environmental and social repercussions. Research analyzing environmental conflicts in four Andean countries (Colombia, Ecuador, Peru, and Bolivia) found that conflicts tend to disproportionately affect indigenous populations and those with Afro-descent, and peasant communities. These conflicts can arise as a result of shifting economic patterns, land use policies, and social practices due to extractivist industries.

==== Chile ====
Beginning in the late 15th century, when European explorers began sailing to the New World, the violence towards and oppression of indigenous populations have had lasting effects to this day. The Mapuche-Chilean land conflict has roots dating back several centuries. When the Spanish went to conquer parts of South America, the Mapuche were one of the only indigenous groups to successfully resist Spanish domination and maintain their sovereignty. Moving forward, relations between the Mapuche and the Chilean state declined into a condition of malice and resentment. Chile won its independence from Spain in 1818 and, wanting the Mapuche to assimilate into the Chilean state, began crafting harmful legislation that targeted the Mapuche. The Mapuche have based their economy, both historically and presently, on agriculture. By the mid-19th century, the state resorted to outright seizure of Mapuche lands, forcefully appropriating all but 5% of Mapuche lineal lands. An agrarian economy without land essentially meant that the Mapuche no longer had their means of production and subsistence. While some land has since been ceded back to the Mapuche, it is still a fraction of what the Mapuche once owned. Further, as the Chilean state has attempted to rebuild its relationship with the Mapuche community, the connection between the two is still strained by the legacy of the aforementioned history.

Today, the Mapuche people are the largest population of indigenous people in Chile, with 1.5 million people accounting for over 90% of the country's indigenous population.

==== Ecuador ====
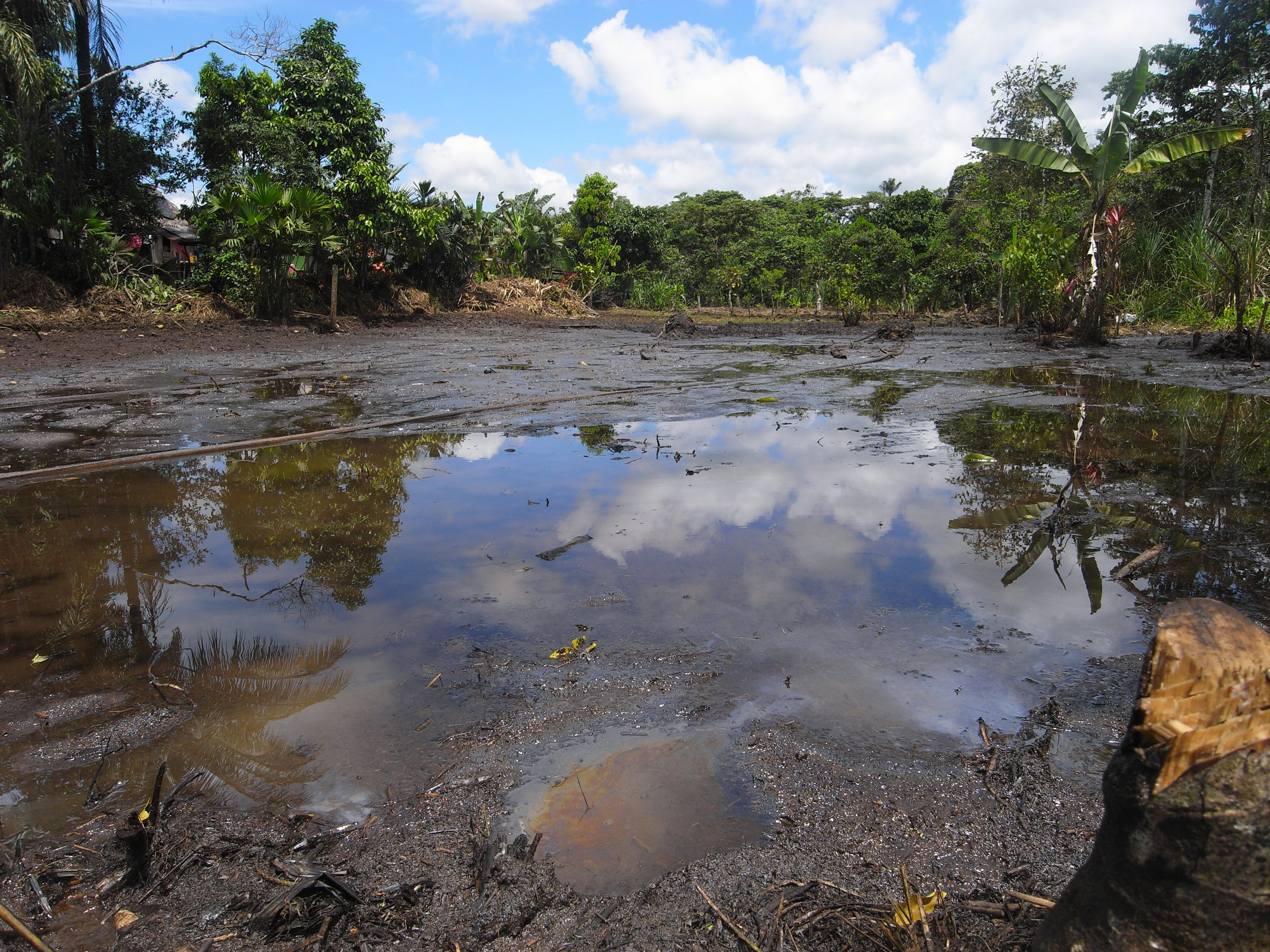
Aftermath of Lago Agrio oil field

In 1993, 30,000 Ecuadorians, which included Cofan, Siona, Huaorani, and Quichua indigenous people, filed a lawsuit against Texaco oil company for the environmental damages caused by oil extraction activities in the Lago Agrio oil field. After handing control of the oil fields to an Ecuadorian oil company, Texaco did not properly dispose of its hazardous waste, causing great damages to the ecosystem and crippling communities.

Additionally, UN experts have said that Afro-Ecuadorians and other people of African descent in Ecuador have faced greater challenges than other groups in accessing clean water, with minimal response from the State.

== See also ==
* Biological inequity
- Climate change and poverty
- Fenceline community
- Health inequality and environmental influence
- NIMBY
- Pollution haven hypothesis
- Racial capitalism
- Sacrifice zone
- Toxic colonialismTransport divide – Unequal access to transport
