= 2021–2022 Peruvian mining protests =

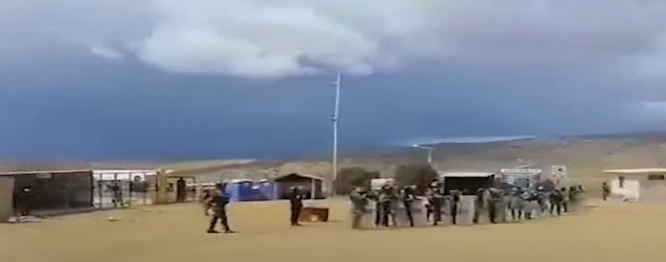
Mining protests in Ayacucho

On July 23, 2021, following Pedro Castillo's electoral victory, mining communities near Las Bambas copper mine blocked the road used to transport the copper. The protesters claimed that local communities saw little benefit from the wealth generated by the mining.

== Background ==
The Las Bambas Mine is one of the largest mines in Peru and produces 2% of the world's copper. Additionally, the protests tests Castillo's campaign promise to strike to redistribute mining wealth to local communities. In 2015, the Las Bambas copper mine experienced large-scale protests which led to the deaths of 3 people and 17 injured. Another wave of strikes arrived in 2020, which forced MMG Limited, the Chinese firm which owns the Las Bambas copper mine, to declare force majeure on some contracts.

== Attempts at resolution ==
=== September 2021 ===
To resolve the renewed waves of protests, a delegation led by then Prime Minister Guido Bellido arrived to Tambobamba on September 17, 2021. The Prime Minister pledged to negotiate a solution between the mining communities and MMG Limited within two months. However, two weeks later the miners grew upset over a perceived lack of progress, and thus resumed their strike.

Another truce was reached in September 30. Later, Mining Minister Iván Merino claimed that the unrest at the Las Bambas copper mine was partly caused by the mining company's decision to rely on a dirt road for transportation. Merino claimed that the dirt road fuels tension as it reveals the stark disparity of the wealth extracted from the mine and the living condition of the workers and called for a train line to be built. Merino also noted that tensions were not limited to the Las Bambas copper mine, but that there was tension all over the country.

=== October 2021 ===
Later, the protesters warned that if an agreement was not reached by October 5, they would resume the blockade of the road. The leader of Chumbivilcas province accused the Castillo Administration of continuing the same system as previous governments, while the mayor of Haquira denounced the ongoing dialogue as a "joke." Chumbivilca's leaders have demanded a better road, compensation for land use, tax transfers, and jobs for locals. Meanwhile, Cotabambas's leaders called for a new meeting to discuss how to better redistribute copper taxes. Protestors have also criticized the trucks that ply the dirt road every day and spread dust, which ruins their crops. Either community could block the road again, the leaders said.

MMG Limited stated that they respected the right to protest, but that protests should not affect others, such as free movement on roads, or the violation of rule of law. They also claimed that they offered numerous proposals to the protestors, such as "including local businesses in the value chain, activities for the development and agricultural equipment, productive chains, improvement of pastures, zoosanitary campaigns, international exchange programs for young people, implementation of entrepreneurship in community women's organizations, among others." MMG Limited accused the protestors of breaking off dialogue and warned that they soon might have to paralyze their operations "completely" due to the protests.

On October 5, 2021, Peru's government said that it had reached a deal between the protestors and MMG Limited. The company will hire Chumbivilcas residents to provide services to the mine, such as transporting minerals and maintaining key transit roads. Meanwhile, negotiations with Cotabambas are still underway.

Incidentally, also on October 5, 200 indigenous protestors took over a pipeline station owned by Petroperú, Peru's state-owned oil company. Also on the same day, protestors from Espinar Province blocked a key highway of Glencore's Antapaccay copper mine. The Espinar protestors stated that they were protesting against both the company and the government, saying that they demanded the resignation of then Prime Minister Guido Bellido. Coincidentally, then PM Bellido resigned the day afterward. On October 8, the Espinar protestors announced that they reached an agreement to begin negotiations with the Antapaccay mine, thus bringing the protests to a halt.

On October 18, 2021, the Cotabambas protestors announced a 24-hour "preventive strike." On October 19, the Cotabambas protestors announced an indefinite strike, once again blocking the road which Las Bambas copper mine uses. The protestors called for Castillo to commit to continuing the dialogue and for PM Mirtha Vásquez to arrive in the area. The protests quickly spread across Áncash, Loreto and the south of Ayacucho. On October 27, 2021, Vásquez arrived to Cotabambas. She said she would "reestablish dialogue and peace."

On October 28, 2021, the protests ceased once more. The government announced it had reached six agreements, which would see the Las Bambas mine commit to paying mining royalties to local communities starting 2022. While Las Bambas' contract calls for it to pay mining royalties on its profits, the mine hadn't reported any profits, and thus didn't pay mining royalties.

However, later that day, violent protests broke out in Áncash and southern Ayacucho against the Antamina mine. Several offices, including the mining headquarters were set on fire after a confrontation with the police. The Council of Ministers announced that it would send representatives to Ayacucho to negotiate with the protestors. The protests were subsequently halted.

=== November 2021 ===
On November 9, 2021, protestors blocked the Las Bambas mine's transport road once again. Victor Limaypuma, the President of the Cotabambas Defense Front, claimed that the government and the mining company failed to send senior representatives for scheduled talks. Limaypuma stated that the blockade of the Las Bambas mine would last 48 hours. He also claimed that the Las Bambas mine had brought pollution to the area and little economic development.

On November 17, 2021, the state-owned oil company Petroperú announced that it had evacuated one of its oil stations in the Amazon rainforest after the Saramuro indigenous community gave the company a 72-hour ultimatum to leave the facility. Additionally, it was announced that the oil station, which transported oil to the coast, had ceased operations since early October because of the protests. The protestors, who were armed with spears, were backed by the Awajún Río Apaga Native Federation (FENARA) and the Peoples Affected by Oil Activity (PAAP).

On November 20, 2021, Prime Minister Mirtha Vásquez stated that 4 mines in the Ayacucho region would not be allowed any extensions in their operational timelines, and that the mines will be closed as soon as possible under environmental grounds. Business and mining interest groups heavily criticized this decision. Additionally, Chumbivilcas residents once again blocked the key road used by the Las Bambas copper mine on the basis that the mining company had not fulfilled its commitments and asked for renewed dialogue with the government and the mining company.

On November 22, 2021, the Ayacucho Central Struggle Committee (CLCA) backed PM Vásquez, saying that the "environmental mining conflict that we have been dragging on for more than 10 years. In that sense, we believe that the current government, through the premier, has done nothing abnormal, but listened to and attended to the populations affected by mining pollution." The CLCA accused mining pollution of wiping out biodiversity in the Huanca Huanca basin and the Sangonera River basin, and negatively affecting over 50,000 peasants and agricultural producers. The announcement came after criticism of Vásquez for her decision to close down 4 mines in the Ayacucho region.

On November 23, 2021, Chumbivilcas protestors demanded that the Las Bambas copper mine employ local residents for the transportation of mineral concentrate, vans, and maintenance of micro pavement. The protest representative, Víctor Villaack, acknowledged that said demand wasn't part of the October 5 agreement negotiated by the Bellido cabinet, but claimed that the "derisory amounts" offered as payments has bothered local communities. He said that locals are offered $300 per month for van driving and $2,000 per month for the transport of concentrate. Villaack's also brought his lawyer claim that current suppliers receive $3,500,000 per concentrate transport trip and accusing the mining company of trying to discourage local residents from becoming suppliers.

On November 25, 2021, communities in Ayacucho region said they would resume protests if the Castillo Administration reneged on their agreement to close the mines. Previously, Prime Minister Mirtha Vásquez said that no extensions would be given to mines that are approaching their closure date, and that they would be closed as soon as possible. However, Vásquez later softened her tone, saying that mines would be able to seek extension to their operation dates, and that there would be no "unilateral" closures.

== Production stops ==
On December 3, 2021, MMG Limited's Las Bambas copper mine announced that it would shut down copper production starting mid-December due to the road blockades. Eduardo González Toro, the Minister of Energy and Mines, said that the government had not been informed about the potential shutdown and that it hoped the company and "would continue working for the benefit of (surrounding) communities." MMG executives urged the government to pave the road in the medium term, and to build a railway in the long term. While Castillo has endorsed the train, it's expected to cost $9.2 billion, and would only begin operations in 2028 at the earliest. Prior to MMG Limited's acquisition of the Las Bambas copper mine, there was a plan to build a mineral pipeline. However, Las Bambas head of corporate affairs said "What local families tell us is that a mineral pipeline would negatively affect the area, because all the businesses associated with (copper) transport would cease to exist." After a month of truce and negotiations in July 2022, the local communities declined to sign an extension when the truce expired with the local protest leaders claiming no progress had been made in meeting their demands or fulfilling previous commitments made by the company.
