= Las Bambas copper mine =

Mine in Peru

Coordinates: 14.0990°S 72.3198°W

Las Bambas copper mine is an open-pit copper mine in the Cotabambas province of Peru. With over a billion tons of copper ore, the deposit is one of the largest in the world and produces 2% of global copper. Las Bambas also produces molybdenum concentrates. Development began on the mine in August 2015 and production began in early 2016.

The mine has resulted in multiple environmental conflicts between 2015 and 2022. About 15,000 people protested the mine during the early phases of construction, resulting in clashes with police who shot and killed four local people. There were continued protests in 2021-2022, when protestors blockaded the mine and complained that they received few benefits from the mine.

Minerals and Metals Group acquired Las Bambas copper project from Glencore Xstrata plc. for US$5.85 billion. White & Case, advised the consortium comprised by Minerals and Metals Group (62.5%), a wholly owned subsidiary of Guoxin International Investment Co. Ltd (22.5%) and CITIC Metal Co. Ltd (15.0%).

== Production and Geology ==
The polymetallic mine is located at altitude of about 4000 meters above sea level in Challhuahuacho District of Cotabambas Province in the Apurímac Region of the southern Peruvian Andes.

Production is about 140,000 tons of copper ore / day. The estimated mine life is at least 20 years.

Las Bambas project also produces molybdenum concentrates. Both metals are transported to Puerto Matarani, first overland to a transfer station in Pillones followed by railways to Matarani Port. Geoservice Ingeniería prepared the Environmental Impact Assessment (EIA) for expansion of the Pillones transfer station.

GyM S.A, the largest construction company in Peru and a subsidiary of the Graña y Montero company, in 2012 was in charge of constructing the copper concentration plant with a capacity of 140,000 t/day.

Production at the mine was scheduled to start in 2015 following an 80% confirmation completion of the project on 31 Dec 2014. The first production of concentrate out of the mine is expected to be in the first quarter of 2016.

== Conflict ==
To make way for the mine, the Fuerabamba community was resettled into the city of Nueva Fuerabamba (New Fuerabamba), which was built between 2012 and 2014. Golder Associates made the Environmental Impact Assessment (EIA) studies back on 2010, since then there have been two amendments to said studies one of them being carried by SNC-Lavalin on 2014, the amendment of EIA included updated project schedule, auxiliary components of the project and the respective water management system.

== See also ==
- List of mines in Peru
- List of open-pit mines
