= Nueva Fuerabamba =

- Town
- Location within Peru
- Coordinates: 14°08′06″S 72°14′06″W
- Country: Peru
- Region: Apurímac Region
- Province: Cotabambas Province
- District: Challhuahuacho District
- Established: 2014
- Elevation: 3,830 m (12,570 ft)

Population
  - Total: 1,200

Nuevo Fuerabamba is a town in the Challhuahuacho District, in the Cotabambas Province, in the department of Apurímac of southern Peru. It was erected by the construction company Graña y Montero between 2012 and 2014 for the resettlement of the peasant community of Fuerabamba, which was affected by the open pit of the Las Bambas copper mine, located 20.5 km away.

It consists of 441 two- and three-story houses, a nursery, an elementary school, a secondary school, a quick-response station, a health center (category I-4 with hospitalization), and a cemetery.
