= 2015 Peruvian protests against Las Bambas mining project =

Environmental protests in Peru

- Location of Cotabambas Province, the hotbed of protests
- Date: 28 September 2015–present
- Location: Apurímac Region, Peru
- Caused by: Las Bambas mining project
- Result: 30-day state of emergency; Protest repressed by force

Parties
Anti-mining activists Locals; FDIC	National Police of Peru; Peruvian Army

Lead figures
Jaime Osorio	

Number
15,000	1,500 police officers 150 soldiers

Casualties and losses
4 dead 15 injured 22 arrested	8 injured

The protests escalated on 29 September, when four people were killed and dozens injured in clashes between demonstrators and police, prompting President Ollanta Humala to decree a state of emergency.

== 29 September clashes ==
External videos
- Three killed in protest at massive copper mine in Peru on Reuters

On 29 September, an estimated 15,000 people gathered in Challhuahuacho to protest against a $7.4 billion copper mine project. Locals in the region are concerned that the copper mine project will cause environmental damage to the Andean area. Peruvian authorities sent 1,500 police officers and 150 soldiers to the area. Several hundred demonstrators attacked the mine installations and clashed with police, who responded with tear gas. The protest escalated, after law enforcers opened fire on protesters, killing four of them. The four fatalities were all local men. In a press conference, authorities confirmed that Uriel Elguera Chilca (34), Beto Chahuallo Huillca (24) and Alberto Cárdenas Chalco (23) died from gunshots on way to Cusco, while Exaltación Huamaní (30) succumbed to death at Challhuahuacho hospital. Likewise, 23 other people, including eight policemen, were injured in ensuing clashes. Officials say ambulances couldn't reach the local clinic following the attack because police also shot at a vehicle carrying doctors.

MMG says that Las Bambas has reserves of 6.9 million tons of copper and expects to produce more than 2 million tons of copper concentrate in its first five years. The deposit was discovered at more than 4,000 meters above sea level and will become one of the largest copper mines in the world once it is in full production. Construction started on 10 August and began operations in early 2016.

== Reactions ==
Peruvian President Ollanta Humala regretted the loss of lives during the violent repression of the protest and called on calm and for dialogue. He also stated that "many of the protest leaders (...) come from outside the region and are using the protests to promote their campaigns for the April 2016 general elections".

Humala decreed the emergency for 30 days in the southern Andean regions of Cusco and Apurímac, where the mine, Las Bambas, owned by China's MMG Ltd., is under construction. The state of emergency applies to six provinces. Suspending civil liberties and authorizing military patrols, the government announced that more troops would be sent to Apurímac "to restore internal peace". Interior Minister José Luis Pérez Guadalupe said radical groups from outside the area had provoked the clashes.

Amnesty International's executive director in Peru, Marina Navarro, called the deaths "unacceptable" in an email sent to the AP. "The price of social protests should not be the death of any person", the statement said.
