= Environmental justice =

System of fairness

Environmental justice is a social movement that addresses perceived injustice which are alleged to occur when poor or marginalized communities are harmed by hazardous waste, resource extraction, and other land uses from which they do not benefit. The movement has generated hundreds of studies which contend exposure to environmental harm is inequitably distributed. Additionally, it is argued many marginalized communities, including Black/racialized communities and the LGBTQ community, are disproportionately impacted by natural disasters.

Environmental justice is broadly defined by proponents as fair treatment and meaningful involvement of all people regardless of race, color, national origin, or income with respect to the development, implementation, and enforcement of environmental laws, regulations, and policies. Over time, scholars have elaborated multiple dimensions of the concept.

The movement began in the United States in the 1980s. It was heavily influenced by the American civil rights movement and focused on environmental racism within rich countries. The movement was later expanded to consider gender, LGBTQ people, international environmental injustice, and inequalities within marginalized groups. As the movement achieved some success in more developed countries, it was argued environmental burdens were shifted to the Global South (for example through extractivism or the global waste trade). The movement for environmental justice has thus become more global, with some of its aims now being articulated by the United Nations. The movement overlaps with movements for Indigenous land rights and for the human right to a healthy environment.

The goal of the environmental justice movement is to achieve what proponents believe is agency for marginalized communities in making environmental decisions that affect their lives. The global environmental justice movement arises from local environmental conflicts in which environmental defenders frequently confront multi-national corporations in resource extraction or other industries. Local outcomes of these conflicts are increasingly influenced by trans-national environmental justice networks.

Environmental justice scholars have produced an interdisciplinary body of social science literature that includes contributions to political ecology, environmental law, and theories on justice and sustainability.

== Scope ==
Environmental justice has evolved into a comprehensive global movement, introducing numerous concepts to political ecology, including ecological debt, environmental racism, climate justice, food sovereignty, corporate accountability, ecocide, sacrifice zones, and environmentalism of the poor. It aims, in part, to augment human rights law, which traditionally overlooked the relationship between the environment and human rights. Despite attempts to integrate environmental protection into human rights law, challenges persist, particularly concerning climate justice.

Scholars such as Kyle Powys Whyte and Dina Gilio-Whitaker have extended the discourse on environmental justice concerning Indigenous peoples and settler-colonialism. Gilio-Whitaker critiques distributive justice, which assumes a capitalistic commodification of land inconsistent with many Indigenous worldviews. Whyte explores environmental justice within the context of colonialism's catastrophic environmental impacts on Indigenous peoples' traditional livelihoods and identities.

== Definitions ==
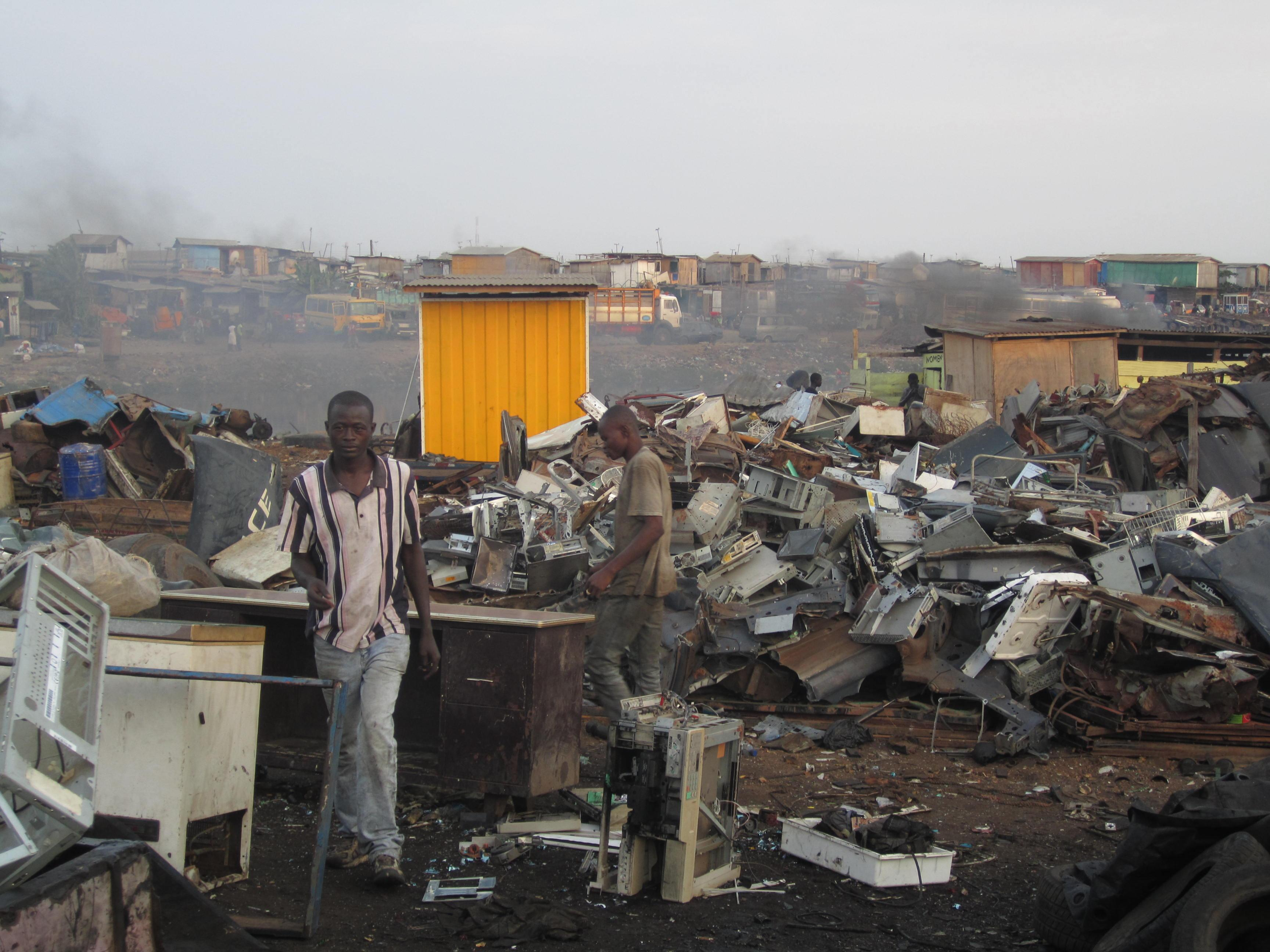
Low-income workers in Ghana recycling waste from high-income countries, with recycling conditions heavily polluting the Agbogbloshie area.

The United States Environmental Protection Agency defines environmental justice as:

the fair treatment and meaningful involvement of all people regardless of race, color, national origin, or income with respect to the development, implementation, and enforcement of environmental laws, regulations and policies. Fair treatment means that no group of people, including racial, ethnic, or socio-economic groups, should bear a disproportionate share of the negative environmental consequences resulting from industrial, municipal, and commercial operations or the execution of federal, state, local, and tribal programs and policies

Environmental justice is also discussed as environmental racism or environmental inequality.

Environmental justice is typically defined by proponents as a form of distributive justice, which is the equitable distribution of environmental risks and benefits. Some definitions address procedural justice, which is the fair and meaningful participation in decision-making. Other scholars emphasize recognition justice, which is the recognition of oppression and difference in environmental justice communities. People's capacity to convert social goods into a flourishing community is also perceived as important for a just society. However, initiatives have been taken to expand the notion of environmental justice beyond the three pillars of distribution, participation, and recognition to also include the dimensions of self-governing authority, relational ontologies, and epistemic justice.

Robert D. Bullard writes that environmental justice, as a social movement and ideological stewardship, may instead be seen as a conversation of equity. Bullard writes that equity is distilled into three board categories: procedural, geographic, and social. From his publication "Confronting Environmental Racism in the Twenty-First Century," he draws out the difference between the three within the context of environmental injustices:

Procedural equity refers to the "fairness" question: the extent that rules, regulations, evaluation criteria and enforcement are applied uniformly across the board and in a non-discriminatory way. Unequal protection might result from nonscientific and undemocratic decisions, exclusionary practices, public hearings held in remote locations and at inconvenient times, and use of English-only material as the language in which to communicate and conduct hearings for non-English-speaking publics.

Geographic equity refers to the location and spatial configuration of communities and their proximity to environmental hazards, noxious facilities and locally unwanted land uses (Lulus) such as landfills, incinerators, sewage treatment plants, lead smelters, refineries and other noxious facilities. For example, unequal protection may result from land-use decisions that determine the location of residential amenities and disamenities. The poor and communities of color, it is argued, often suffer a "triple" vulnerability of noxious facility siting, as do the unincorporated—sparsely populated communities that are not legally chartered as cities or municipalities and are therefore usually governed by distant county governments rather than having their own locally elected officials.

Social equity assesses the role of sociological factors (race, ethnicity, class, culture, life styles, political power, etc.) on environmental decision making. Poor people and people of colour often work in the most dangerous jobs and live in the most polluted neighbourhoods, their children exposed to all kinds of environmental toxins in the playgrounds and in their homes.

=== Indigenous environmental justice ===
In non-Native communities, where toxic industries and other discriminatory practices are said to be disproportionately occurring, residents rely on laws and statutory frameworks outlined by the EPA. They rely on distributive justice, centered around the nature of private property. Native Americans do not fall under the same statutory frameworks as they are citizens of Indigenous nations, not ethnic minorities. As individuals, they are subject to American laws. As nations, they are subject to a separate legal regime, constructed on the basis of pre-existing sovereignty acknowledged by treaty and the U.S. Constitution. Environmental justice to Indigenous persons is not understood by legal entities but rather their distinct cultural and religious doctrines.

Environmental Justice for Indigenous peoples follows a model that frames issues in terms of their colonial condition and can affirm decolonization as a potential framework within environmental justice. While Indigenous peoples' lived experiences vary from place to place, David Pellow writes that there are "common realities they all share in their experience of colonization that make it possible to generalize an Indigenous methodology while recognizing specific, localized conditions". Even abstract ideas like the right to a clean environment, a human right according to the United Nations, contradicts Indigenous peoples understanding of environmental justice as it reflects the commodification of land when seen in light of property values.

=== Critical environmental justice ===
Drawing on concepts of anarchism, posthumanism, critical theory, and intersectional feminism, author David Pellow created the concept of Critical Environmental Justice (CEJ). Critical EJ is a perspective intended to address a number of limitations and tensions within EJ Studies. Critical EJ calls for scholarship that builds on environmental justice studies by questioning assumptions and gaps in earlier work, embracing greater interdisciplinary, and moving towards methodologies and epistemologies including and beyond the social sciences. Critical EJ scholars believe that multiple forms of inequality drive and characterize the experience of environmental injustice.

Differentiation between conventional environmental studies and Critical EJ studies is done through four distinctive "pillars". These include: (1) intersectionality; (2) spatial and temporal scale; (3) working toward solutions and justice outside of the state; and (4) as beings as indispenable.

In What is Critical Environmental Justice, Pellow explains:

Where we find rivers dammed for hydropower plants we also tend to find indigenous peoples and fisherfolk, as well as other working people, whose livelihoods and health are harmed as a result; when sea life suffers from exposure to toxins such as mercury, we find that human beings also endure the effects of mercury when they consume those animals; and the intersecting character of multiple forms of inequality is revealed when nuclear radiation or climate change affects all species and humans across all social class levels, racial/ethnic groups, genders, abilities, and ages.

== History ==
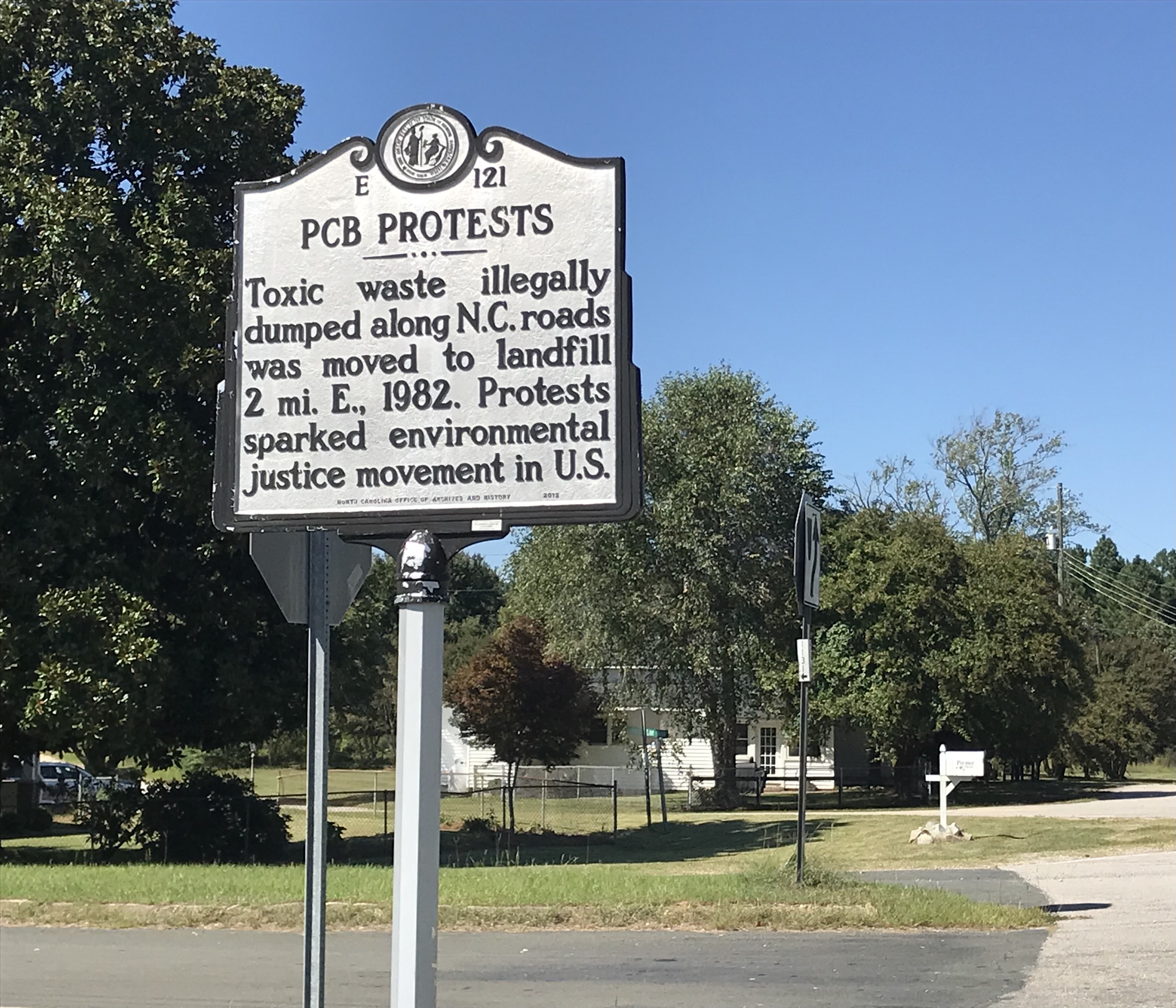
Highway marker in Afton commemorating the 1982 North Carolina PCB landfill protests.

Traces of environmental injustices span millennia of unrecorded history. For instance, Indigenous peoples have experienced environmental devastation of a genocidal kind for several centuries. Origins of the environmental justice movement can be traced to the Indigenous Environmental Movement, which has involved Indigenous populations fighting against displacement and assimilation for sovereignty and land rights for hundreds of years. For instance, Chaco Culture National Historical Park, a landscape that is sacred to the Diné people and part of the Navajo Nation, was once a center of uranium mining and a hotspot for oil and gas production. Although now closed, the mines continue to impact the health of the surrounding Indigenous community, leaving members continuously advocating for community protection. Ironically, the various Indigenous territories, which make up 22% of the world's land surface, hold about 80% of the world's remaining biodiversity.

The terms 'environmental justice' and 'environmental' racism' did not enter the common vernacular until the first environmental justice cases were brought to court in 1979 in Texas, and in 1982 in North Carolina. The 1979 case, Bean v. Southwestern Waste Management Corporation was in response to a decision placing a garbage dump in Northwood Manor in East Houston. Citing that this decision was racially motivated, R. Bullard was asked to compile data from 1970 to 1979 addressing "all landfills, incinerators and solid waste sites" located in Houston, TX at that time. While the case was lost, it set the legal precedent for environmental justice as a legislative term, with Bullard's findings being later confirmed in a 1983 federal report.

Origins of the Warren County, North Carolina, environmental justice movement

Much of the thinking, language, and strategy for the environmental justice movement emerged from the rural, sparsely populated community of Afton, Warren County, North Carolina in late 1978 in response to an explosive December 21 surprise announcement by Governor James B. Hunt Jr.'s Administration that "public sentiment would not deter the state's plan to purchase private land in Warren County." to bury PCB-tainted soil that had been spewed the previous summer along some 270 miles of roadsides in fourteen counties and at the Ft. Bragg Army Base.

With the announcement came notice of an EPA Public Hearing scheduled in Warren County for January 4, 1979, where the state would present its PCB landfill plan for EPA approval. Warren County residents responded with a fury, first forming a steering committee, and then uniting on December 26, 1978, as a multi-racial coalition of some 150 citizens who formed themselves into an official body, Warren County Citizens Concerned About PCBs (WCCC).

In 1982, the residents of Warren County, North Carolina protested against a landfill designed to accept polychlorinated biphenyls in the 1982 PCB protests. Thirty-thousand gallons of PCB fluid lined 270 miles of roadway in fourteen North Carolina Counties, and the state announced that a landfill would be built rather than undergoing permanent detoxification. Warren County was chosen, the poorest county in the state with a per capita income of around $5,000 in 1980^{[1]}, and the site was set for the predominantly Black community of Afton. Its residents protested for six-weeks, leading to over 500 arrests.

That the protests in Warren County were led by civilians led to the basis of future and modern-day environmental, grassroots organizations fighting for environmental justice. Rev. Benjamin Chavis was serving for the United Church of Christ (UCC) Commission for Racial Justice when he was sent to Warren County for the protests. Chavis was among the 500 arrested for taking part in the nonviolent protests and is credited with having coined the term "environmental racism" while in the Warren County jail. His involvement, alongside Rev. Leon White, who also served for the UCC, laid the foundation for more activism and consciousness-raising. Chavis would later recall in a New Yorker's article titled "Fighting Environmental Racism in North Carolina" that while "Warren County made headlines … [he] knew in the eighties you couldn't just say there was discrimination. You had to prove it." Fighting for change, not recognition, is an additional factor of environmental justice as a social movement.

In response to the Warren County Protests, two cross-sectional studies were conducted to determine the demographics of those exposed to uncontrolled toxic waste sites and commercial hazardous waste facilities. The United Church of Christ's Commission for Racial Justice studied the placement of hazardous waste facilities in the US and found that race was the most important factor predicting placement of these facilities. These studies were followed by widespread objections and lawsuits against hazardous waste disposal in poor, generally Black, communities. The mainstream environmental movement began to be criticized for its predominately white affluent leadership, emphasis on conservation, and failure to address social equity concerns.

The EPA established the Environmental Equity Work Group (EEWG) in 1990 in response to additional findings by social scientists that "racial minority and low-income populations bear a higher environmental risk burden than the general population' and that the EPA's inspections failed to adequately protect low-income communities of color". In 1992, the EPA published Environmental Equity: Reducing Risks for All Communities - the first time the agency embarked on a systematic examination of environmental risks to communities of color. This acted as their direction of addressing environmental justice.

In 1993 the EPA founded the National Environmental Justice Advisory Council (NEJAC). In 1994 the office's name was changed to the Office of Environmental Justice as a result of public criticism on the difference between equity and justice. ^{SOURCE} That same year, President Bill Clinton issued Executive Order 12898, which created the Interagency Working Group on Environmental Justice. The working group sought to address environmental justice in minority populations and low-income populations. David Pellow writes that the executive order "remains the cornerstone of environmental justice regulation in the US, with the EPA as its ventral arbiter".

=== Emergence of global movement ===
Throughout the 1970s and 1980s, grassroots movements and environmental organizations advocated for regulations which increased the costs of hazardous waste disposal in the US and other industrialized nations. However, this led to a surge in exports of hazardous waste to the Global South during the 1980s and 1990s. This global environmental injustice, including the disposal of toxic waste, land appropriation, and resource extraction, sparked the formation of the global environmental justice movement.

Environmental justice as an international subject commenced at the First National People of Color Environmental Leadership Summit in 1991, held in Washington, DC. The four-day summit was sponsored by the United Church of Christ's Commission for Racial Justice. With around 1,100 persons in attendance, representation included all 50 states as well as Puerto Rico, Brazil, Chile, Mexico, Ghana, Liberia, Nigeria, and the Marshall Islands. The summit broadened the environmental justice movement beyond its anti-toxins focus to include issues of public health, worker safety, land use, transportation, housing, resource allocation, and community empowerment. The summit adopted 17 Principles of Environmental Justice, which were later disseminated at the 1992 Earth Summit in Rio, Brazil. The 17 Principles have a likeness in the Rio Declaration on Environment and Development.

In the summer of 2002, a coalition of non-governmental organizations met in Bali to prepare final negotiations for the 2002 Earth Summit. Organizations included CorpWatch, World Rainforest Movement, Friends of the Earth International, the Third World Network, and the Indigenous Environmental Network. They sought to articulate the concept of climate justice. During their time together, the organizations codified the Bali Principles of Climate Justice, a 27-point program identifying and organizing the climate justice movement. Meena Raman, Head of Programs at the Third World Network, explained that in their writing they "drew heavily on the concept of environmental justice, with a significant contribution from movements in the United States, and recognized that economic inequality, ethnicity, and geography played roles in determining who bore the brunt of environmental pollution". At the 2007 United Nations Climate Conference, or COP13, in Bali, representatives from the Global South and low-income communities from the North created a coalition titled "Climate Justice Now!". CJN! Issued a series of "genuine solutions" that echoed the Bali Principles.

Initially, the environmental justice movement focused on addressing toxic hazards and injustices faced by marginalized racial groups within affluent nations. However, during the 1991 Leadership Summit, its scope broadened to encompass public health, worker safety, land use, transportation, and other issues. Over time, the movement expanded further to include considerations of gender, international injustices, and intra-group disparities among disadvantaged populations. Citizen suits can contribute to selective prosecution.

=== Key dimensions include ===
- Distributive justice: Ensuring equitable distribution of environmental benefits (such as clean water and green space) and burdens (such as pollution and hazardous waste) across communities.
- Procedural justice: Guaranteeing that all affected communities have a meaningful voice in environmental decision-making, including access to information, participation in policymaking, and access to justice.
- Recognition justice: Acknowledging and respecting the distinct cultural, social, and historical experiences of marginalized groups, including Indigenous peoples.

Key scholars shaping these perspectives include David Schlosberg, who emphasized the three pillars of distribution, recognition, and participation; Kristin Shrader-Frechette, who highlighted intergenerational ecological justice; and Joan Martínez-Alier, whose concept of "environmentalism of the poor" emphasizes struggles in the Global South.

== Environmental discrimination and conflict ==
The environmental justice movement seeks to address environmental discrimination and environmental racism associated with hazardous waste disposal, resource extraction, land appropriation, and other activities. This environmental discrimination results in the loss of land-based traditions and economies, armed violence (especially against women and indigenous people) environmental degradation, and environmental conflict. The global environmental justice movement arises from these local place-based conflicts in which local environmental defenders frequently confront multi-national corporations. Local outcomes of these conflicts are increasingly influenced by trans-national environmental justice networks.

There are many divisions along which an unjust distribution of environmental burdens may fall. Within the US, race is the most important determinant of environmental injustice. In other countries, poverty or caste (India) are important indicators. Tribal affiliation is also important in some countries. Environmental justice scholars Laura Pulido and David Pellow argue that recognizing environmental racism, as an element stemming from the entrenched legacies of racial capitalism, is crucial to the movement, with white supremacy continuing to shape human relationships with nature and labor.

=== Environmental racism ===
Environmental racism is a pervasive and complex issue that affects communities all over the world. It is a form of systemic discrimination that is grounded in the intersection of race, class, and environmental factors.

At its core, environmental racism refers to the disproportionate exposure of people of color to environmental hazards such as pollution, toxic waste, land distribution, and other environmental risks. Environmental racism has a long and troubling history, with many examples dating back to the early 20th century. Policies such as redlining, that involved denying loans and insurance to communities of color, alongside segregation, led to some communities being located in areas with high levels of pollution, unequal access to outdoor spaces, and exposure to other environmental hazards. These communities are often located near industrial sites, waste facilities, and other sources of pollution that can have serious health impacts.

Today, environmental racism continues to be a significant environmental justice issue, with many low-income communities and communities of colour facing disproportionate exposure to pollution, unequal outdoor access, and other environmental hazards. This can have serious impacts on the health and well-being of these communities, leading to higher rates of asthma, cancer, and other illnesses.

Addressing environmental racism requires a multifaceted approach that tackles the underlying social, economic, and political factors that contribute to its persistence. In the US, The Low country Alliance for Model Communities (LAMC) combats environmental racism by empowering marginalized neighborhoods in North Charleston, South Carolina, using community-based research and collaborative problem-solving to identify solutions to health and environmental disparities. These communities are often located near industrial sites, waste facilities, and other sources of pollution that can have serious health impacts.

Similarly, environmental justice scholars from Latin America and elsewhere advocate to understand this issue through the lens of decolonisation. The latter underlies the fact that environmental racism emanates from the colonial projects of the West and its current reproduction of colonial dynamics.

=== Outdoor access ===
In the United States, spending time outdoors is often framed as something that is accessible to everyone. However, the history of land use in the United States was largely dependent on the dispossession of Indigenous land; this fundamentally reshaped who could access and control outdoor spaces. This continued into the 19th and early 20th centuries, during the creation of public lands and parks. For conservationists and preservationists, who were predominantly white and elite, protecting nature relied on the removal of the people who originally lived there; the movement erased Indigenous relationships with the land and changed societal norms surrounding who belongs in outdoor spaces. These inequalities were further enforced by housing policy decisions during the early 20th century. Redlining and segregation confined many communities of color to areas with fewer parks, more environmental issues, and less access to outdoor spaces.

Many minority groups are still facing persistent barriers that prevent equal access to green spaces. Data shows that higher income neighborhoods have significantly higher levels of vegetation and park coverage compared to lower income areas. More broadly, access to nature remains limited, with barriers like cost and transportation impacting the ability of some minority groups to spend time outdoors, reinforcing existing inequalities within these spaces.

These inequalities are complicated further by contemporary changes to relationships between humans and nature. Today, urbanization has diminished "possibilities for human contact with nature", making access to outdoor spaces much harder, especially for already marginalized groups. Equal access to green spaces has been shown to be incredibly important, with some studies framing access to nature as a public health issue. New research shows that access to green spaces is strongly linked to better mental health and cognitive development, especially in children and teens. This data makes it difficult to ignore outdoor access as an important environmental justice issue, shaping relationships with nature. These relationships are vital, as they play a role in fostering long-term environmental advocacy and stewardship. Studies show that programs focusing on nature-based recreation tend to serve as a pathway towards environmental action and advocacy. Environmental justice activists have increasingly framed outdoor access as a public health, urban planning, and land distribution issue, showing how access to green spaces emerges as a result of structural inequalities that shape the distribution of environmental benefits.

=== Hazardous waste ===
As environmental justice groups have grown more successful in developed countries such as the United States, the burdens of global production have been shifted to the Global South where less-strict regulations make waste disposal cheaper. Export of toxic waste from the US escalated throughout the 1980s and 1990s. Many impacted countries do not have adequate disposal systems for this waste, and impacted communities are not informed about the hazards they are being exposed to.

The Khian Sea waste disposal incident was a notable example of environmental justice issues arising from international movement of toxic waste. Contractors disposing of ash from waste incinerators in Philadelphia, Pennsylvania illegally dumped the waste on a beach in Haiti after several other countries refused to accept it. After more than ten years of debate, the waste was eventually returned to Pennsylvania. The incident contributed to the creation of the Basel Convention that regulates international movement of toxic waste.

=== Land appropriation ===
Countries in the Global South disproportionately bear the environmental burden of global production and the costs of over-consumption in Western societies. This burden is exacerbated by changes in land use that shift vast tracts of land away from family and subsistence farming toward multi-national investments in land speculation, agriculture, mining, or conservation. Land grabs in the Global South are engendered by neoliberal ideology and differences in legal frameworks, land prices, and regulatory practices that make countries in the Global South attractive to foreign investments. These land grabs endanger indigenous livelihoods and continuity of social, cultural, and spiritual practices. Resistance to land appropriation through transformative social action is also made difficult by pre-existing social inequity and deprivation; impacted communities are often already struggling just to meet their basic needs.

=== Resource extraction ===
Resource extraction is a prime example of a tool based on colonial dynamics that engenders environmental racism. Hundreds of studies have shown that marginalized communities, often indigenous communities, are disproportionately burdened by the negative environmental consequences of resource extraction. Communities near valuable natural resources are frequently saddled with a resource curse wherein they bear the environmental costs of extraction and a brief economic boom that leads to economic instability and ultimately poverty. Indigenous communities living near valuable natural resources face even more discrimination, since they are in most cases simply displaced from their home. Power disparities between extraction industries and impacted communities lead to acute procedural injustice in which local communities are unable to meaningfully participate in decisions that will shape their lives.

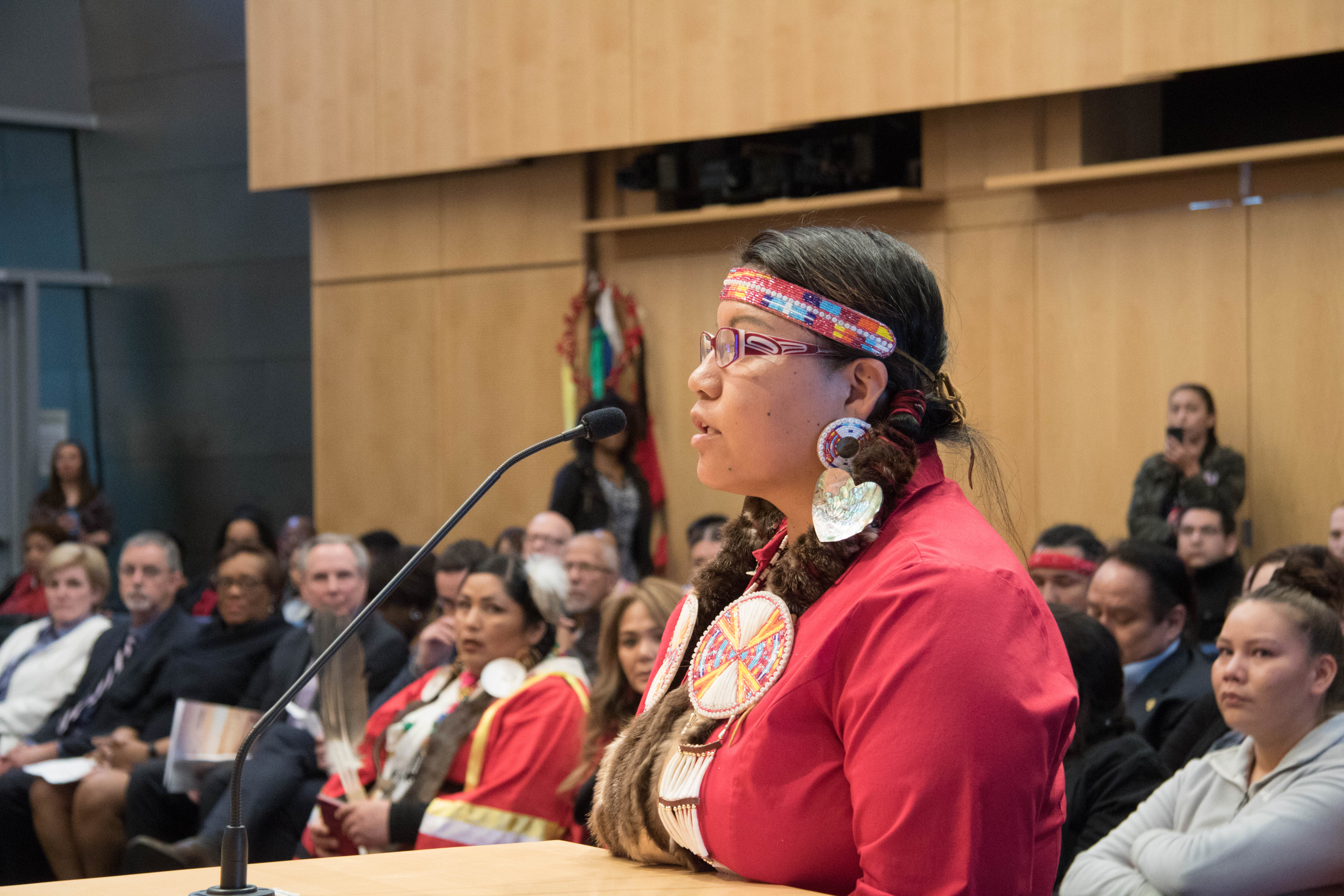
Council member Debora Juarez gives a speech at the designation of May 5th as Seattle's Day of Awareness for Missing and Murdered Indigenous Women and Girls.

Studies have also shown that extraction of critical minerals, timber, and petroleum may be associated with armed violence in communities that host mining operations. The government of Canada found that resource extraction leads to missing and murdered indigenous women in communities impacted by mines and infrastructure projects such as pipelines. The Environmental Justice Atlas, that documents conflicts of environmental justice, demonstrates multiple conflicts with high violence on indigenous populations around resource extraction.

=== Unequal exchange ===
Unequal exchange is a term used to describe the unequal economic and trade relationship between countries from the Global North and the Global South. The idea is that the exchange of goods and services between these countries is not equal, with Global North countries benefiting more than the others. This occurs for a variety of reasons such as differences in labor costs, technology, and access to resources. Unequal exchange perceives this framework of trade through the lens of decolonisation: colonial power dynamics have led to a trade system where northern countries can trade their knowledge and technology at a very high price against natural resources, materials and labor at a very low price from southern countries. This is kept in place by mechanisms such as enforceable patents, trade regulations and price setting by institutions such as the World Bank or the International Monetary Fund, where northern countries hold most of the voting power. Hence, unequal exchange is a phenomenon that is based on and perpetuates colonial relationships, as it leads to exploitation and enforces existing inequalities between countries of the Global North and Global South. This interdependence also explains the differences in CO_{2} emissions between northern and southern countries: evidently, since northern countries use many resources and materials of the South, they produce and pollute more.

=== Health impacts of disparate exposure in EJ communities ===
Environmental justice communities that are disproportionately exposed to chemical pollution, reduced air quality, and contaminated water sources may experience overall reduced health. Poverty in these communities can be a factor that increases their exposure to occupational hazards such as chemicals used in agriculture or industry. When workers leave the work environment they may bring chemicals with them on their clothing, shoes, skin, and hair, creating further impacts on their families, including children. Children in EJ communities are uniquely exposed, because they metabolize and absorb contaminants differently than adults. These children are exposed to a higher level of contaminants throughout their lives, beginning in utero (through the placenta), and are at greater risk for adverse health effects like respiratory conditions, gastrointestinal conditions, and mental conditions.

A 2025 American Thoracic Society workshop report identified three forms of climate-related environmental inequality: differences in exposure to environmental hazards, differences in susceptibility to their health effects, and differences in access to resources that help communities adapt. For example, neighborhoods with limited green space and extensive paved surfaced can experience higher temperatures due to the urban heat island effect. Extreme heat and wildfire smoke can also worsen existing respiratory conditions, including asthma and chronic obstructive pulmonary disease (COPD). The reporr further notes that lower-income communities may lack access to air conditioning, backup electricity, or the financial resources needed to escape extreme heat, making it more difficult to adapt to climate related hazards.

Fast fashion exposes environmental justice communities to occupational hazards such as poor ventilation that can lead to respiratory problems from inhalation of synthetic particles and cotton dust. Textile dyeing can also expose EJ communities to toxins and heavy metals when untreated wastewater enters water systems used by residents and for livestock. 95% of clothing production takes place in low- or middle-income countries where the workers are under-resourced.

=== Erasure of women ===
Though the environmental justice movement seeks to address discrimination, women have historically been discriminated against as the movement evolves from advocacy to institutional change. While grassroots campaigning activities are often dominated by women, gender inequality is more prevalent in institutionalized activities of organizations dominated by salaried professionals. Women have fought back against this trend by establishing their own domestic and international non-governmental organizations, such as the Women's Earth and Climate Action Network (WECAN) and Women's Earth Alliance (WEA).

The US Environmental Protection Agency's definition of environmental injustice does not include gender, instead mentioning environmental injustice to concern race, color, national origin, and income. Gender inequalities in governing bodies have been noted to have an impact on the nature of decisions made, and so consequently federal legislation and discussion surrounding environmental justice often does not include factors of sex. Authors David Pellow and Robert Brulle write in "Environmental justice: human health and environmental inequalities" that environmental injustices "affect human beings unequally along the lines of race, gender, class and nation, so an emphasis on any one of these will dilute the explanatory power of any analytical approach".

These inequalities have led to the establishment of the Global Gender and Climate Alliance, set up jointly by the United Nations, the IUCN (International Union for Conservation of Nature), and WEDO (Women, Environment and Development Organization). These have all been founded to raise the profile of gender issues in climate change policymaking.

=== LGBTQ+ environmental justice ===
The LGBT+ community experiences environmental injustice in a variety of ways. For instance, the LGBT+ community experiences disproportionately worse living conditions than straight, cisgendered people, as they are more likely to experience identity-based discrimination, rejection from housing opportunities, and higher rents, compared to outside of the community. These poorer housing conditions lead to higher risks of air pollution and a lack of air conditioning. For instance, one study found that neighborhoods with high concentrations of same-sex couples had greater exposure to hazardous air pollutants and a 9.8-13.3% higher risk of respiratory illness. Additionally, the LGBT+ community experiences higher rates of poverty: the poverty rate for the LGBT+ community was 17% in 2021, compared to 12% in non-LGBT+ communities.

These issues are likely to worsen with climate change. As extreme high temperatures and heat waves become more common, the LGBT+ community will be less likely to have access to air conditioning due to higher poverty rates. When there are extreme temperatures, there are higher rates of heat-related deaths through heat stroke, dehydration, and cardiovascular and respiratory diseases. These increased health risks will lead to disparate health burdens on the LGBT+ community, as LGBT+ community members, already experiencing higher poverty and homelessness rates, will likely experience higher rates of heat-related illnesses and deaths than straight, cisgendered people.

Another way that the LGBT+ community experiences environmental injustice is through a lack of support after natural disasters. In the US, the LGBT+ community has a 120% higher risk of experiencing homelessness than those outside the community, with 40% of homeless youth identifying as LGBT. This leaves the community on the front lines of natural disasters.

Additionally, LGBT+ people experience discrimination from natural disaster relief programs. For instance, during Hurricane Katrina, a transgender person was jailed for showering in a women's restroom after being permitted to do so by a relief volunteer. Similarly, after the 2004 Indian Ocean tsunami, the Aravanis (who do not identify as male or female) were excluded from relief programs, temporary shelters, and official death records. These instances of discrimination make it harder for LGBT+ people to recover from natural disasters.

However, LGBT+ community members have created ways to overcome discrimination during natural disasters by creating their own communities of care. For instance, after Hurricane Maria caused severe damage to Puerto Rico, LGBT+ community members created their own food collection drives to provide residents with access to healthy, culturally relevant food. This was done to reduce hunger for a community that experiences higher poverty rates and less support from disaster organization.

== In environmental law ==
=== Cost barriers ===
One of the prominent barriers to minority participation in environmental justice is the initial costs of trying to change the system and prevent companies from dumping their toxic waste and other pollutants in areas with high numbers of minorities living in them. There are massive legal fees involved in fighting for environmental justice and trying to shed environmental racism. For example, in the United Kingdom, there is a rule that the claimant may have to cover the fees of their opponents, which further exacerbates any cost issues, especially with lower-income minority groups; also, the only way for environmental justice groups to hold companies accountable for their pollution and breaking any licensing issues over waste disposal would be to sue the government for not enforcing rules. This would lead to the forbidding legal fees that most could not afford. This can be seen by the fact that out of 210 judicial review cases between 2005 and 2009, 56% did not proceed due to costs.

== Relationships to other movements and philosophies ==
=== Climate justice ===
Emissions of the richest 1% are more than twice that of the poorest 50%. Compliance with the Paris Agreement's 1.5°C goal would require the richest 1% to reduce emissions by at least 30 times, while per-person emissions of the poorest 50% could approximately triple.

Though total CO_{2} emissions (size of pie charts) differ substantially among high-emitting regions, the pattern of higher income classes emitting more than lower income classes is consistent across regions. The world's top 1% of emitters emit over 1000 times more than the bottom 1%.

Scaling the effect of wealth to the national level: richer (developed) countries emit more CO_{2} per person than poorer (developing) countries. Emissions are roughly proportional to GDP per person, though the rate of increase diminishes above average GDP/pp of about $10,000.

Climate change and climate justice have also been a component when discussing environmental justice and the greater impact it has on environmental justice communities. Air pollution and water pollution are two contributors of climate change that can have detrimental effects such as extreme temperatures, increase in precipitation, and a rise in sea level. Because of this, communities are more vulnerable to events including floods and droughts potentially resulting in food scarcity and an increased exposure to infectious, food-related, and water-related diseases. Currently, without sufficient treatment, more than 80% of all wastewater generated globally is released into the environment. High-income nations treat, on average, 70% of the wastewater they produce, according to UN Water.

It has been projected that climate change will have the greatest impact on vulnerable populations.

Climate justice has been influenced by environmental justice, especially grassroots climate justice.

=== Ocean justice ===
Marine biologist Ayana Elizabeth Johnson describes ocean justice as: "where ocean conservation and issues of social equity meet: Who suffers most from flooding and pollution, and who benefits from conservation measures? As sea levels rise and storms intensify, such questions will only grow more urgent, and fairness must be a central consideration as societies figure out how to answer them"

In December 2023 Biden's administration published a strategy report focused on improving ocean justice. The main targets of this strategy:

- Repair past injustice when people depending on the ocean and contributing very little to environmental destruction, suffered from the impacts of this destruction on the oceans. Those include Indigenous peoples, African Americans, Hispanic and Latino Americans.
- Use the knowledge of indigenous people and marine communities in general for restore ocean justice and help ocean conservation.

Environmental groups supported the decision. According to Beth Lowell, the vice president of Oceana (non-profit group): "Offshore drilling, fisheries management and reducing plastic pollution are just a few of the areas where these voices are needed".

In the official document summarizing the new strategy, the administration gave several examples of past implementation of those principles. One of them is Mai Ka Po Mai a strategy for the management of the Papahānaumokuākea Marine National Monument near the Hawaiian Islands conceived after consultations with native communities.

=== Environmentalism ===
Relative to general environmentalism, environmental justice is seen as having a greater focus on the lives of everyday people and being more grassroots. Environmental justice advocates have argued that mainstream environmentalist movements have sometimes been racist and elitist. This is because the environmental movement was originally composed of White men. People of color were banned from entering national and state parks and other public recreational sites until 1964, severely hindering their ability to participate in the environmental movement. This led to White environmental activists ignoring environmental justice issues like environmental racism. Although more people of color have joined the environmental movement, a 2018 study found that people of color account for only 20% of the staff of environmental organizations despite making up 36% of the overall US population, indicating that barriers still persist.

=== Degrowth ===
Environmental justice and degrowth have been considered to be complementary movements, because they both seek a political-ecological reorganisation of societies towards sustainability and both are concerned with questions of justice. Scholars have argued that degrowth can support environmental justice by asking for resource caps and implementing policies that reduce the extraction of materials, while fostering relations of care between members of both movements has been proposed as a requirement to achieve their goals. For these reasons, the possibility of an alliance between degrowth and environmental justice has been proposed.

The possibility of an alliance, however, remains contested. Scholars from the Global South identify tensions and divergences in their aims and tactics. Similarly, degrowth's emphasis on frugality has led to criticisms of it being a Eurocentric project and unsuitable for social groups in other parts of the world. Ultimately, scholars argue that more research is needed, for example by quantifying the ecological stressors externalized to the Global South, by estimating the effects of degrowth policies, by identifying resonant narratives shared between both movements, and by explicitly integrating an internationalist agenda in degrowth's proposals that supports environmental justice movements in the Global South

=== Reproductive justice ===
Many participants in the Reproductive Justice Movement see their struggle as linked with those for environmental justice, and vice versa. Loretta Ross describes the reproductive justice framework as addressing "the ability of any woman to determine her own reproductive destiny" and argues this is "linked directly to the conditions in her community – and these conditions are not just a matter of individual choice and access." Such conditions include those central to environmental justice – including the siting of toxic waste and pollution of food, air, and waterways.

Mohawk midwife Katsi Cook founded the Mother's Milk Project in the 1980s to address the toxic contamination of maternal bodies through exposure to fish and water contaminated by a General Motors Superfund site. In underscoring how contamination disproportionately impacted Akwesasne women and their children through gestation and breastfeeding, this project illustrates the intersections between reproductive and environmental justice. Cook explains that, "at the breasts of women flows the relationship of those generations both to society and to the natural world."

=== Ecofeminism ===
Ecofeminst find the intersection between environmentalism and feminist philosophy. Ecofeminism is not to be confused with movements or studies on the health impacts of women in the environment. Researcher and author Sarah Buckingham explains that the basis of ecofeminism is rooted in the argument that "women's equality should not be achieved at the expense of worsening the environment, and neither should environmental improvements be gained at the expense of women." Its origins are drawn in feminist theory, feminist spirituality, animal rights, social ecology, and antinuclear, antimilitarist organizing. On account of its range of intersectionality, ecofeminism has been criticized for its incoherency and lack of potential in addressing climate crisis.

Ecofeminist concerns are taken up by feminist researchers who participate in environmental organizations or contribute to national and international debates. Examples of such include the National Women's Health Network's research around industrial and environmental health; critiques of reproductive technology and genetic engineering by the Feminist Network of Resistance to Reproductive and Genetic Engineering (FINRRAGE); and critiques of environmental approaches to population control by the Committee on Women, Population, and the Environment.

=== Survival activism ===
There is no single universal definition of survival activism in scholarly literature. However, some scholarly journals and articles speak on the concept of survival, such as the Black Panther Party in the United States, and the use of "survival programs". The Black Panther Party provided free breakfast and free food programs to black communities and neighbourhoods as a way to provide resources and address the problems of hunger caused by government class oppression during the late 1960s to early 1970s. It was a way for the Party and communities to resist and empower themselves from the oppressions they endured. This is significant due to the concept of using survival revolution, which is still used in different forms of activism to this day.

Additionally the concept of survival as a form of activism was seen in environmentalism of the poor, which was a term used in the 1990s as a way to refer to talk about the disadvantaged communities, specifically those residing in India, who are being affected by industrial industries and are losing their way of life, on how environmentalism is not about fixing the problems of industrial growth like clean air, but its on protecting the minimal things essential for survival like, their water, income, and existence.

==== Relation to environmental justice ====
Environmentalism is viewed by First Nations, in Canada described their everyday struggles that affect their ability to exist, and their relationship to the land, removing the Western views and perspectives that are based on wilderness. The use of survival as a form of activism allows for the protection of being and a protection of a larger understanding of environmental protection and connection to it.

==== Other forms of activism in environmental justice ====
Activism is a form of social movement that helps influence change and is done publicly. Activism can take different forms, both by action, like petitions, protests, or less physical forms, such as changing lifestyles and practices.

Currently, in other forms of activism like biodiversity conservation, it is seen through economic and social lenses, causing there not to be little spending on this issue. The global protected areas spending is approximately $24.3 billion/year, making it not a priority. Survival activism changes the lens of preventing extinction to one that is focused on human and organism survival.

Grassroots Activism

Grassroots Activism is a movement and concept in which it bring in the issues of race, class, and culture and their relationship to the environment and moves away from resource conservation. Due to communities affected by economic expansion, which has caused their communities to become polluted, they have used their land sovereignty and identity to motivate this local activism.

An example of this is in Chester, Pennsylvania, which faced environmental injustices due to waste facilities that brought effects in the air quality and noise levels, with over 60% of the waste-processing industries located in this community. This community is predominantly African American and has high poverty rate. In 1992, the communities met for the first time to talk about the impacts it was having on the community. It was not until a study in 1994, conducted by the Environmental Protection Agency, that the community had health risks, including cancer, kidney and liver diseases, due to the pollution and traced it back to the waste facilities. The community complained during a public meeting in October 1992. Then, in December 1992, the residents had a protest by stopping waste trucks from reaching their locations. But even with grassroots activism, permits for additional waste facilities were still passing. The community of Chester is an example of the struggle in fighting against power relations.

Social Media and Data Collection Activism

Data Collection Activism is a movement that uses technology and data to encourage and bring awareness to social and economic justice issues. It does so by organizing and saving information and making it available and accessible for the public to view. An example is the case of the Enbridge Northern Gateway Project, in which the community raised awareness on the issue of the 1,170km pipeline that was going to be transported by Alberta Oil Sands to Kitimat, British Columbia, by sharing it through Twitter the promotional video that was misleading.

=== Forms of survival activism ===
==== The Movement for the Survival of the Ogani People (MOSOP) ====
In the Nigerian Delta, the Movement for the Survival of the Ogani People (MOSOP), created in 1990, which was founded by Ken-Saro Wiwa, advocated in the context of environmental justice and against the exploitation of oil extraction. It was discovered that oil companies operating under Oil Mining Lease were impacting 47 Ogani communities, such as polluting their water and farm land, which is embedded in their way of life and survival. They were not given compensation, even with oil spillages occurring. The communities campaigned and took action against multinational companies with the ideology of protecting their communities' survival. Participation included oil theft and other illegal activities. The shortcomings came with leadership and only seeing it through the survival of their own communities and not of a wider scope.

==== South America ====
In the global south, women defenders, who protect human rights and the environment, are put at risk and targeted in forms of violence, oppression, food insecurity, and even death. This data is gathered using the Environmental Justice Atlas, which illustrates the consequences of taking part in Survival Activism. Research has shown that political and human environments are interconnected and are shown by the land patterns. The environment is connected with cultures, economies, and religions.

Survival activism in this case is understood as a decolonization movement that describes how local community members actively resist extractivism and the exploitation of their land, territory, and livelihoods, and is viewed through the lens of surviving and protecting their culture, identity, self-determination, and land.

==== Survival ecology ====
Survival ecology is the ideology that understands that there are going to be changes in the environment, and that one needs to take action through "non-violent civil disobedience."

== Around the world ==
Environmental justice campaigns have arisen from local conflicts all over the world. The Environmental Justice Atlas documented 3,100 environmental conflicts worldwide as of April 2020 and emphasised that many more conflicts remained undocumented.

=== Africa ===
==== Democratic Republic of the Congo ====
Mining for cobalt and copper in the Democratic Republic of the Congo (DRC) has resulted in environmental injustice and numerous environmental conflicts including

- Mutanda mine
- Kamoto mine
- Tilwezembe mine

Conflict minerals mined in the DRC perpetuate armed conflict.

==== Ethiopia ====
Mining for gold and other minerals has resulted in environmental injustice and environmental conflict in Ethiopia including

- Lega Dembi mine: thousands of people were exposed to mercury by MIDROC corporation, resulting in poisoned food, death of livestock and many miscairrages and birth defects.
- Kenticha mine

==== Kenya ====
Kenya has, since independence in 1963, focused on environmental protectionism. Environmental activists such as Wangari Maathai stood for and defend natural and environmental resources, often coming into conflict with the Daniel Arap Moi and his government. The country has suffered environmental issues arising from rapid urbanization especially in Nairobi, where the public space, Uhuru Park, and game parks such as the Nairobi National Park have suffered encroachment to pave way for infrastructural developments like the Standard Gage Railway and the Nairobi Expressway. Environmental lawyer Kariuki Muigua has championed environmental justice and access to information and legal protection, authoring the Environmental Justice Thesis on Kenya's milestones.

==== Nigeria ====
From 1956 to 2006, up to 1.5 million tons of oil were spilled in the Niger Delta, (50 times the volume spilled in the Exxon Valdez disaster). Indigenous people in the region have suffered the loss of their livelihoods as a result of these environmental issues, and they have received no benefits in return for enormous oil revenues extracted from their lands. Environmental conflicts have exacerbated ongoing conflict in the Niger Delta.

Ogoni people, who are indigenous to Nigeria's oil-rich Delta region have protested the disastrous environmental and economic effects of Shell Oil's drilling and denounced human rights abuses by the Nigerian government and by Shell. Their international appeal intensified dramatically after the execution in 1995 of nine Ogoni activists, including Ken Saro-Wiwa, who was a founder of the nonviolent Movement for the Survival of the Ogoni People (MOSOP).

==== South Africa ====
Under colonial and apartheid governments in South Africa, thousands of black South Africans were removed from their ancestral lands to make way for game parks. Earthlife Africa was formed in 1988, making it Africa's first environmental justice organisation. In 1992, the Environmental Justice Networking Forum (EJNF), a nationwide umbrella organization designed to coordinate the activities of environmental activists and organizations interested in social and environmental justice, was created. By 1995, the network expanded to include 150 member organizations and by 2000, it included over 600 member organizations.

With the election of the African National Congress (ANC) in 1994, the environmental justice movement gained an ally in government. The ANC noted "poverty and environmental degradation have been closely linked" in South Africa. The ANC made it clear that environmental inequalities and injustices would be addressed as part of the party's post-apartheid reconstruction and development mandate. The new South African Constitution, finalized in 1996, includes a Bill of Rights that grants South Africans the right to an "environment that is not harmful to their health or well-being" and "to have the environment protected, for the benefit of present and future generations through reasonable legislative and other measures that

1. prevent pollution and ecological degradation;
2. promote conservation; and
3. secure ecologically sustainable development and use of natural resources while promoting justifiable economic and social development".

South Africa's mining industry is the largest single producer of solid waste, accounting for about two-thirds of the total waste stream. Tens of thousands of deaths have occurred among mine workers as a result of accidents over the last century. There have been several deaths and debilitating diseases from work-related illnesses like asbestosis. For those who live next to a mine, the quality of air and water is poor. Noise, dust, and dangerous equipment and vehicles can be threats to the safety of those who live next to a mine as well. These communities are often poor and black and have little choice over the placement of a mine near their homes. The National Party introduced a new Minerals Act that began to address environmental considerations by recognizing the health and safety concerns of workers and the need for land rehabilitation during and after mining operations. In 1993, the Act was amended to require each new mine to have an Environmental Management Program Report (EMPR) prepared before breaking ground. These EMPRs were intended to force mining companies to outline all the possible environmental impacts of the particular mining operation and to make provision for environmental management.

In October 1998, the Department of Minerals and Energy released a White Paper entitled A Minerals and Mining Policy for South Africa, which included a section on Environmental Management. The White Paper states "Government, in recognition of the responsibility of the State as custodian of the nation's natural resources, will ensure that the essential development of the country's mineral resources will take place within a framework of sustainable development and in accordance with national environmental policy, norms, and standards". It adds that any environmental policy "must ensure a cost-effective and competitive mining industry."

=== Asia ===
Noah Diffenbaugh and Marshall Burke in their study of inequality in Asia demonstrated the interactionalism of economic inequality and global warming. For instance, globalization and industrialization increased the chances of global warming. However, industrialization also allowed wealth inequality to perpetuate. For example, New Delhi is the epicenter of the industrial revolution in the Indian continent, but there is significant wealth disparity. Furthermore, because of global warming, countries like Sweden and Norway can capitalize on warmer temperatures, while most of the world's poorest countries are significantly poorer than they would have been if global warming had not occurred.

==== China ====
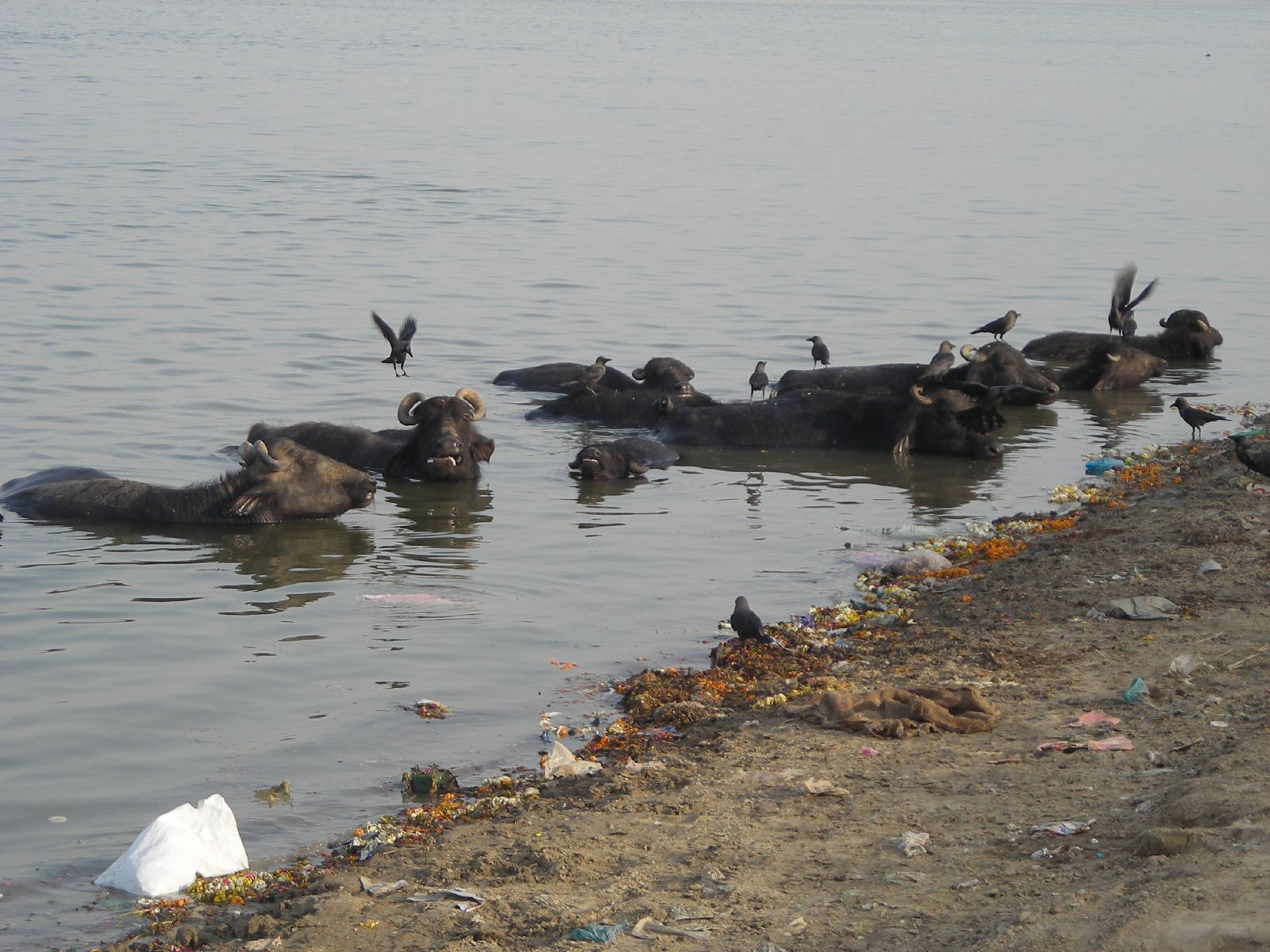
Cattle in the River Ganges with pollution on the bank.

In China, factories create harmful waste such as nitrogen oxide and sulfur dioxide which cause health risks. Journalist and science writer Fred Pearce notes that in China "most monitoring of urban air still concentrates on one or at most two pollutants, sometimes particulates, sometimes nitrogen oxides or sulfur dioxides or ozone. Similarly, most medical studies of the impacts of these toxins look for links between single pollutants and suspected health effects such as respiratory disease and cardiovascular conditions." The country emits about a third of all the human-made sulfur dioxide (SO_{2}), nitrogen oxides (NO_{x}), and particulates pollution in the world. The Global Burden of Disease Study, an international collaboration, estimates that 1.1 million Chinese die from the effects of this air pollution each year, roughly a third of the global death toll." The economic cost of deaths due to air pollution is estimated at 267 billion yuan (US$38 billion) per year.

==== Indonesia ====
Environmental conflicts in Indonesia include:

- The Arun gas field where ExxonMobil's development of a natural gas export industry contributed to the insurgency in Aceh in which secessionist fighters led by the Free Aceh Movement attempted to gain independence from the central government which had taken billions in gas revenues from the region without much benefit to the Aceh province. Violence directed toward the gas industry led Exxon to contract with the Indonesian military for protection of the Arun field and subsequent human rights abuses in Aceh.

==== Malaysia ====
Environmental justice movements in Malaysia have arisen from conflicts including:

- Lynas Advanced Materials Plant: rare earth processing plant producing over a million tonnes of radioactive waste from 2012-2023.

==== South Korea ====
Environmental justice movements in South Korea have arisen from conflicts including:

- Saemangeum Seawall
- Seoul-Incheon canal

=== Australia ===
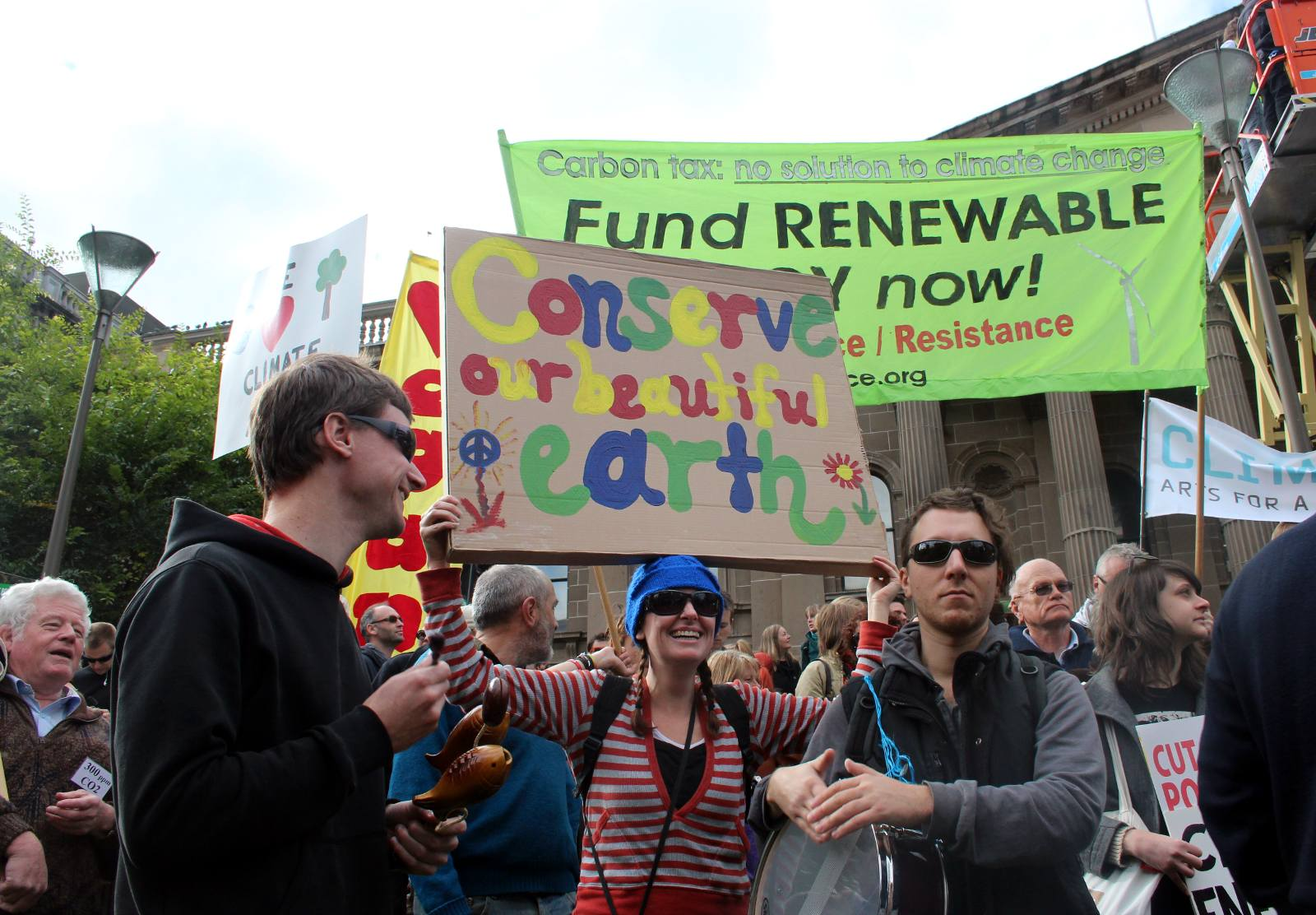
World Environment Day, June 5, 2011; tens of thousands of people rallied around Australia to say Yes to a safe climate and in support of a carbon price.

Australia has suffered from a number of environmental injustices, which have usually been caused by polluting corporate projects geared towards extracting natural resources. For example, discriminatory siting of nuclear and hazardous waste facilities. These projects have been detrimental to local climates, biodiversity, and the health of local citizen populations from poorer economic areas. They have also faced little resistance from local and national governments, who tend to cite their 'economic' benefits. However, these projects have faced strong resistance from environmental justice organizations, community, and indigenous groups. Australia has a prominent Indigenous population, and they often disproportionately face some of the worst impacts of these projects.

- WestConnex Highway Project, Sydney and New South Wales (NSW)

The WestConnex Highway Project emerged as an answer to Sydney's lack of infrastructure to cope as a fast growing city. The highway project is currently under construction, covers 33 km of new and improved highway, and will link up to the city's M4 and M5 highways.The newest WestConnex toll roads opened in 2019. The NSW government believe that the highway is the 'missing link' to the city's problem of traffic congestion, and has argued that the project will provide further economic benefits such as job creation.

The WestConnex Action Group (WAG) have said that residents close to the highway have been negatively affected by its high levels of air pollution, caused by an increase in traffic and unventilated smokestacks in its tunnels. Protesters have also argued that the close proximity of the highway will put children especially at risk.

The highway has faced resistance in a variety of forms, including a long-running occupation camp in Sydney Park, as well as confrontations with police and construction workers that have led to arrests. The WAG has set up a damage register for people whose property has been damaged by the highway, in order to document the extent of the damages, and support those who have been affected. The WAG have done this through campaigning for a damage repaid fund, independent damage assessment and potential class action.

- Yeelirrie Uranium Mine, Western Australia

The Yeelirrie Uranium Mine was facilitated by Canadian company Cameco. The mine aimed to dig a 9 km open mine pit and destroy 2,400 hectares of traditional lands, including the Seven Sisters Dreaming Songline, important to the Tjiwarl people. The mine has faced strong resistance from the Tjiwral people, especially its women, for over decade.

The mine is the largest uranium deposit in the country, and uses nine million litres of water, whilst generating millions of tonnes of radioactive waste. Around 36 million tonnes of this waste will be produced whilst the mine is operational, which is set to be until 2043.

A group of Tjiwral women took Cameco to court, to initial success. The Environmental Protection Authority (EPA) halted the mine because it was very likely to wipe out several species, including rare stygofauna, the entire western population of a rare saltbush, and harm other wild life like the Malleefowl, Princess parrot and Greater bilby. The state and federal authorities, however, went against the EPA and approved the mine in 2019.

- SANTOS Barossa offshore gas in Timor Sea, Northern Territory (NT)

In March 2021, South Australia Northern Territory Oil Search (SANTOS) invested in the Barossa gas field in the Timor Sea, Northern Territory, to great reception from the NT government, saying that it will provide jobs for the local area. The move was condemned by environmental justice organisations, saying that it will have grave impacts on the climate and biodiversity. Crucially, they stressed that the Tiwi people, owners of the local islands, were not adequately consulted, and were worried that any spills would damage local flatback and Olive Ridley turtle populations.

This disregard for the Tiwi people sparked protests from a number of groups, including one in front of the SANTOS Darwin headquarters demanding an end to the Barossa gas project. In September 2021, a coalition of environmental justice organisations from Australia, South Korea and Japan, united under the name Stop Barossa Gas to oppose the project. In March 2022, the Tiwi people filed for a court injunction to stop KEXIM and Korea Trade and Investment Corporation (Korean development finance institutions) funding the project with almost $1bn. The Tiwi people did this on the basis of a lack of consultation from SANTOS, and the detrimental environmental impacts the project will have. In June 2022, the Tiwi people filed another lawsuit for the same reasons, but this time directly against SANTOS.

=== Europe ===
The European Environment Agency (EEA) reports that exposure to environmental harms such as pollution is correlated with poverty, and that poorer countries suffer from environmental harms while higher income countries produce the majority of the pollution. Western Europe has more extensive evidence of environmental inequality.

Since 2013, Alternatiba, Village of Alternatives events have been held in Europe to mobilise society to face the challenges of climate change. These events work to raise people's awareness and to stimulate behaviour change. They have been or will be organized in over sixty different French and European cities, such as Bilbao, Brussels, Geneva, Lyon and Paris.

Romani peoples are ethnic minorities that experience environmental discrimination. Discriminatory laws force Romani people In many countries to live in slums or ghettos with poor access to running water and sewage, or where they are exposed to hazardous wastes.

The European Union is trying to strive towards environmental justice by putting into effect declarations that state that all people have a right to a healthy environment. The Stockholm Declaration, the 1987 Brundtland Commission's Report – "Our Common Future", the Rio Declaration, and Article 37 of the Charter of Fundamental Rights of the European Union, all are ways that the Europeans have put acts in place to work toward environmental justice.

==== Sweden ====
Sweden became the first country to ban DDT in 1969. In the 1980s, women activists organized around preparing jam made from pesticide-tainted berries, which they offered to the members of parliament. Parliament members refused, and this has often been cited as an example of direct action within ecofeminism.

==== United Kingdom ====
Whilst the predominant agenda of the Environmental Justice movement in the United States has been tackling issues of race, inequality, and the environment, environmental justice campaigns around the world have developed and shifted in focus. For example, the EJ movement in the United Kingdom is quite different. It focuses on issues of poverty and the environment, but also tackles issues of health inequalities and social exclusion.

A UK-based NGO, named the Environmental Justice Foundation, has sought to make a direct link between the need for environmental security and the defense of basic human rights. They have launched several high-profile campaigns that link environmental problems and social injustices. A campaign against illegal, unreported and unregulated (IUU) fishing highlighted how 'pirate' fisherman are stealing food from local, artisanal fishing communities. They have also launched a campaign exposing the environmental and human rights abuses involved in cotton production in Uzbekistan. Cotton produced in Uzbekistan is often harvested by children for little or no pay. In addition, the mismanagement of water resources for crop irrigation has led to the near eradication of the Aral Sea. The Environmental Justice Foundation has successfully petitioned large retailers such as Wal-mart and Tesco to stop selling Uzbek cotton.

=== North and Central America ===
==== Belize ====
Environmental justice movements arising from local conflicts in Belize include:

- The government of Belize began granting oil concessions without consulting local communities since 2010, with offshore oil drilling being allowed without consultation with local fishermen or the tourism sector, which are the main economic activities in the area, and affecting Mayan and Garifuna communities. Environmental advocacy group, Oceana, collected over 20,000 signatures in 2011 to trigger a national referendum on offshore oil drilling; however, the government of Belize invalidated over 8,000 signatures, preventing the possibility of an official referendum. In response, Oceana and partner organizations organized an unofficial "People's Referendum," which resulted in 90% of Belizeans voting against offshore exploration and drilling. Belize's Supreme Court declared offshore drilling contracts issued by the Government of Belize in 2004 and 2007 invalid in 2013, but the government reconsidered initiating offshore drilling in 2015, with possible new regulations allowing oil and gas exploration in 99% of Belize's territorial waters. In 2022, Oceana began collecting signatures for another moratorium referendum.
- Chalillo Dam

==== Canada ====
Environmental justice movements arising from local conflicts in Canada include:

- Coastal GasLink pipeline
  - 2020 Canadian pipeline and railway protests
- Fairy Creek timber blockade
- Grassy Narrows road blockade
- Grassy Narrows mercury poisoning
- Trans Mountain pipeline
- Cases of Environmental racism in Nova Scotia

===== Dominican Republic =====
Environmental justice movements arising from local conflicts in the Dominican Republic:

- Pueblo Viejo mine

==== Guatemala ====
Environmental justice movements arising from local conflicts in Guatemala include

- Escobal mine

==== El Salvador ====
Environmental justice movements arising from local conflicts in El Salvador include:

- El Dorado Mine, owned by Pacific Rim Mining Corporation

The Canadian company Pacific Rim Mining Corporation operates a gold mine on the site of El Dorado, San Isidro, in the department of Cabañas. The mine has had hugely negative impacts on the local environment, including the reduction of accessibility to fresh water due to the water intensive mining process, as well as the contamination of the local water supply, which negatively affected the health of local citizens and their live stock. Also, Salvadorian investigators found dangerously high levels of arsenic in two rivers close to the mine.

The operations of the mine has caused conflicts, increased divisions in the community, and prompted threats and violence against opposition to the mine. Following the suspension of the project in 2008 due to resistance from local groups, this violence escalated. As of today, at least half a dozen deaths among local group opposing the mine have been related with the presence of Pacific Rim. The strength of opposition to the mine contributed towards a national movement against the project. In 2008 and 2009, both the incumbent and elected Salvadorian presidents agreed publicly to deny the extension of the licence to Pacific Rim to connote its operations. More recently, the new president Sanchéz Cerén stated "mining is not viable in El Salvador."

==== Honduras ====
Honduras has experienced a number of environmental justice struggles, particularly related to the mining, hydroelectric, and logging industries. One of the most high-profile cases was the assassination of Berta Caceres, a Honduran indigenous and environmental rights activist who opposed the construction of the Agua Zarca Dam on the Gualcarque River. Caceres' murder in 2016 sparked widespread outrage and drew international attention to the risks faced by environmental and indigenous activists in Honduras.

==== Mexico ====
Environmental justice movements arising from local conflicts in Mexico include

- Dolores mine
- El Chanate mine
- La Revancha mine

==== Nicaragua ====
Environmental justice movements arising from local conflicts in Nicaragua include:

- Nicaragua Grand Canal

In 2012, the Nicaraguan government approved the construction of the Grand Canal, which will be 286 km long. A large section of the new canal will run through Lake Nicaragua, which is an important source of fresh water for the country. The canal will also have a width of 83 meters, and depth of 27.5 meters, making it suitable for large-range ships. Related infrastructures include two ports, an airport and an oil pipeline.

Opponents to the construction of the canal, such as the Coordinadora de la comunidad negra creole indígena de Bluefields (CCNCB), fear the impacts it will have on the biodiversity, and protected areas like Bosawás and the Bluefields wetlands. Opponents also fear the impacts on the Indigenous and tribal people that the canal would displace, such as the Miskito, Ulwa and Creole. To date, the Nicaraguan government has not made public the results of various viability studies.

Since the approval of the construction of the canal, environmental justice and indigenous groups have presented petitions for review to national courts, as well as one to the International Human Rights Commission. In 2017, these groups suffered a setback, when the National Court rejected the petition to refuse the "Law of the Grand Canal".

==== United States ====
Definitions of environmental inequality typically emphasize either 'disparate exposure' (unequal exposure to environmental harm) or 'discriminatory intent' (often based on race). Disparate exposure has health and social impacts. Poverty and race are associated with environmental injustice. Poor people account for more than 20% of the human health impacts from industrial toxic air releases, compared to 12.9% of the population nationwide. Some studies that test statistically for effects of race and ethnicity, while controlling for income and other factors, suggest racial gaps in exposure that persist across all bands of income.

States may also see placing toxic facilities near poor neighborhoods as preferential from a Cost Benefit Analysis (CBA) perspective. A CBA may favor placing a toxic facility near a city of 20,000 poor people than near a city of 5,000 wealthy people. Terry Bossert of Range Resources reportedly has said that it deliberately locates its operations in poor neighborhoods instead of wealthy areas where residents have more money to challenge its practices. Northern California's East Bay Refinery Corridor is an example of the disparities associated with race and income and proximity to toxic facilities.

In Seattle, Washington, the Duwamish River Community Coalition was formed in 2001 in response to the designation of the Duwamish River as a Superfund site. DRCC works with local communities and both private and public organizations to address the disparate exposure to air and water pollution families of the Duwamish Valley face. Residents of the Duwamish Valley are a population made of primarily South and Central American immigrants of low income, indigenous peoples, and refugees.

===== African-Americans =====
African-Americans are affected by a variety of Environmental Justice issues. One notorious example is the "Cancer Alley" region of Louisiana. This 85-mile stretch of the Mississippi River between Baton Rouge and New Orleans is home to 125 companies that produce one quarter of the petrochemical products manufactured in the United States. The nickname was given due to the high rates of residents diagnosed with cancer compared to the United States average. The United States Commission on Civil Rights has concluded that the African-American community has been disproportionately affected by Cancer Alley as a result of Louisiana's current state and local permit system for hazardous facilities, as well as their low socio-economic status and limited political influence. Another incidence of long-term environmental injustice occurred in the "West Grove" community of Miami, Florida. From 1925 to 1970, the predominately poor, African American residents of the "West Grove" endured the negative effects of exposure to carcinogenic emissions and toxic waste discharge from a large trash incinerator called Old Smokey. Despite official acknowledgement as a public nuisance, the incinerator project was expanded in 1961. It was not until the surrounding, predominantly white neighborhoods began to experience the negative impacts from Old Smokey that the legal battle began to close the incinerator.

More so, many African-American residents have experienced missed or overlooked health issues that were cause by the environmental disparity of their communities. Unfortunately, many of these complications were overlooked by the healthcare industry and comprised the health of those struggling with respiratory and heart problems. The American Heart Association has compiled data analysis that shows the relationship between air pollution exposure and cardiovascular illness and death.

===== Indigenous Groups =====
Indigenous groups have been the victims of environmental injustices, such as Uranium mining and the Navajo people in the American West. Churchrock, New Mexico, in Navajo territory was home to the longest continuous uranium mining in any Navajo land. From 1954 until 1968, the tribe leased land to mining companies who did not obtain consent from Navajo families or report any consequences of their activities. Not only did the miners significantly deplete the limited water supply, but they also contaminated what was left of the Navajo water supply with uranium. Kerr-McGee and United Nuclear Corporation, the two largest mining companies, argued the Federal Water Pollution Control Act did not apply to them, and maintained that Native American land is not subject to environmental protections. The courts did not force them to comply with US clean water regulations until 1980.

The Inuit community in northern Quebec have faced disproportionate exposure to persistent organic pollutants (POPs) including dioxins and polychlorinated biphenyls (PCBs). Some of these pollutants may include pesticides used decades before in the United States. PCBs bioaccumulate and biomagnify within the fatty tissues of organisms, so the traditional high-fat sea animal diet of the Inuit has posed significant health impacts to both adults and unborn infants. Although the production of PCBs was banned internationally in 2001 by the Stockholm Convention on Persistent Organic Pollutants, they can exist in the environment and biosphere for decades or longer. They pose a significant risk to newborns due to intrauterine exposure and concentration within breast milk.

===== Latinos =====
The most common example of environmental injustice among Latinos is the exposure to pesticides faced by farmworkers. After DDT and other chlorinated hydrocarbon pesticides were banned in the United States in 1972, farmers began using more acutely toxic organophosphate pesticides such as parathion. A large portion of farmworkers in the US are working as undocumented immigrants, and as a result of their political disadvantage, are not able to protest against regular exposure to pesticides or benefit from the protections of Federal laws. Exposure to chemical pesticides in the cotton industry also affects farmers in India and Uzbekistan. Banned throughout much of the rest of the world because of the potential threat to human health and the natural environment, Endosulfan is a highly toxic chemical, the safe use of which cannot be guaranteed in the many developing countries it is used in. Endosulfan, like DDT, is an organochlorine and persists in the environment long after it has killed the target pests, leaving a deadly legacy for people and wildlife.

Residents of cities along the US-Mexico border are also affected. Maquiladoras are assembly plants operated by American, Japanese, and other foreign countries, located along the US-Mexico border. The maquiladoras use cheap Mexican labor to assemble imported components and raw material, and then transport finished products back to the United States. Much of the waste ends up being illegally dumped in sewers, ditches, or in the desert. Along the Lower Rio Grande Valley, maquiladoras dump their toxic wastes into the river from which 95 percent of residents obtain their drinking water. In the border cities of Brownsville, Texas, and Matamoros, Mexico, the rate of anencephaly (babies born without brains) is four times the national average.

===== Youth =====
Held v. Montana was the first state constitutional law climate lawsuit to go to trial in the United States, on June 12, 2023. The case was filed in March 2020 by sixteen youth residents of Montana, then aged 2 through 18, who argued that the state's support of the fossil fuel industry had worsened the effects of climate change on their lives, thus denying their right to a "clean and healthful environment in Montana for present and future generations"^{:Art. IX, § 1} as required by the Constitution of Montana. On August 14, 2023, the trial court judge ruled in the youth plaintiffs' favor, though the state indicated it would appeal the decision. Montana's Supreme Court heard oral arguments on July 10, 2024, its seven justices taking the case under advisement. On December 18, 2024, the Montana Supreme Court upheld the county court ruling.

=== South America ===
Environmental justice struggles have been a significant feature of social and political movements in South America, where communities have faced the impacts of environmental degradation and resource extraction for decades. In particular, mining in South America has led to conflicts between mining companies, governments, and local communities over issues such as land rights, water use, and pollution. Indigenous peoples in particular have been disproportionately affected by mining, with many communities experiencing displacement, loss of traditional livelihoods, and negative health impacts from exposure to toxic chemicals and pollution. A report by Global Witness identifies South America as the most dangerous region in the world for environmental activists, with at least 98 people killed in 2019.

==== Argentina ====
Environmental justice movements arising from local conflicts in Argentina include

- Bajo de la Alumbrera mine, Catamarca, Argentina: The Bajo de la Alumbrera mine is an open-pit copper and gold mine located in the northwestern province of Catamarca, Argentina. The mining project began in the late 1990s and has since been the center of a significant environmental justice conflict. The mine is operated by Glencore, which owns 50% of the stocks, while Canadian companies Goldcorp and Yamana Gold hold 37.5% and 12.5% respectively. People have raised concerns over the mine's potential environmental impacts, including water pollution, deforestation, and the displacement of indigenous communities. The mine's operators have also faced accusations of human rights violations, including the use of excessive force against protesters and the violation of workers' rights. Despite these concerns, the mine continues to operate, and its expansion plans have been met with significant resistance from local communities and environmental groups. After La Alumbrera started operations, other mining projects were rejected in Catamarca.

==== Brazil ====
Environmental justice movements arising from local conflicts in Brazil include

- Belo Monte Hydroelectric Dam, Para, Brasil: Belo Monte is a hydroelectric project on the Xingú River in Brazil that began construction in 2011 and was completed in 2019. It is currently the fifth-largest hydroelectric dam in the world, by installed capacity. It is owned by a consortium called Norte Energia, mostly owned by the government and funded primarily by BNDES, with mining giant Vale owning around 5% of it. The project is the largest infrastructure complex of the Brazilian government's plan to build over 60 large dams in the Amazon Basin over the next 20 years, which has received numerous criticisms and open resistance from organizations, public opinion, and inhabitants of the region. Its construction has been highly conflictive, having been opposed by indigenous peoples, who were not consulted before the authorization of construction. The project has been criticized for lacking environmental impact assessments prior to the start of the works. The Belo Monte Dam has diverted the flow of the Xingu, devastating an extensive area of the rainforest, affecting over 50,000 people and displacing over 20,000. The dam threatens the survival of indigenous tribes that depend on the river.

==== Ecuador ====
Notable environmental justice movements in Ecuador have arisen from several local conflicts:

- Chevron Texaco's oil operations in the Lago Agro oil field resulted in spillage of seventeen million gallons of crude oil into local water supplies between 1967 and 1989. They also dumped over 19 billion gallons of toxic wastewater into unlined open pits and regional rivers. Represented by US lawyer Steven Donziger, Indigenous people fought Chevron in US and Ecuadorian courts for decades in attempts to recover damages.
- The Yasuni-ITT Initiative attempted to prevent oil extraction from Yasuni National Park in 2007, but failed and drilling began in 2016.

==== Peru ====
Notable environmental justice conflicts in Peru include

- Las Bambas copper mine
- Yanacocha gold mine
- Green space disparities in Lima which has led to higher environmental risks in coastal desert communities compared to wealthier ones

In late March, 2024, the Inter-American Court of Human Rights, based in Costa Rica, ruled that the government of Peru is liable for physical and mental harm to people caused by a metallurgical facility's pollution, and ordered the government to provide free medical care and monetary compensation to victims.

== Transnational Movement Networks ==
Many of the Environmental Justice Networks that began in the United States expanded their horizons to include many other countries and became Transnational Networks for Environmental Justice. These networks work to bring Environmental Justice to all parts of the world and protect all citizens of the world to reduce the environmental injustice happening all over the world. Listed below are some of the major Transnational Social Movement Organizations.

- Amazon Watch - organization that campaigns for the protection of the rainforest, and the rights of Indigenous peoples in the Amazon Basin in Ecuador, Peru, Colombia, and Brazil.
- Basel Action Network – works to end toxic waste dumping in poor undeveloped countries from the rich developed countries.
- —a network of activist-researchers that document environmental justice issues around the world.
- Environmental Justice Organisations, Liabilities and Trade (EJOLT) is a multinational project supported by the European Commission. Civil society organizations and universities from 20 countries in Europe, Africa, Latin-America, and Asia are building up case studies, linking organizations worldwide, and making an interactive global map of Environmental Justice.
- GAIA (Global Anti-Incinerator Alliance) – works to find different ways to dispose of waste other than incineration. This company has people working in over 77 countries throughout the world.
- GR (Global Response) – works to educate activists and the upper working class how to protect human rights and the ecosystem.
- Global Witness - an international NGO that investigates and exposes environmental and human rights abuses, corruption, and conflict associated with the exploitation of natural resources.
- Greenpeace International – which was the first organization to become the global name of Environmental Justice. Greenpeace works to raise the global consciousness of transnational trade of toxic waste.
- Health Care without Harm – works to improve public health by reducing the environmental impacts of the health care industry.
- Indigenous Environmental Network - a North American network of indigenous peoples' organizations that work to protect the environment and promote sustainable development.
- International Campaign for Responsible Technology – works to promote corporate and government accountability with electronics and how the disposal of technology affect the environment.
- International POPs Elimination Network – works to reduce and eventually end the use of persistent organic pollutants (POPs) which are harmful to the environment.
- NDN Collective - is an Indigenous-led organization dedicated to building Indigenous, supporting campaigns like 'Land Back', which aims to return Indigenous lands back to Indigenous people.
- PAN (Pesticide Action Network) – works to replace the use of hazardous pesticides with alternatives that are safe for the environment.
- Red Latinoamericana de Mujeres Defensoras de Derechos Ambientales - a regional network that works to promote the rights of women environmental defenders and protect the environment in Latin America.

Global Environmental Activism and Policy

Global environmental inequality is evidence that vulnerable populations are disproportionately victimized by environmental degradation as a result of global capitalism and land exploitation. Yet, studies prove these groups have pioneered the need for intersection between human and environmental rights in activism and policy because of their close proximity to environmental issues. It is important for environmental regulation to acknowledge the value of this global grassroots movement, led by indigenous women and women of the global south, in determining how institutions such as the United Nations can best deliver environmental justice. In recent years, the United Nations' approach to issues concerning environmental health has begun to acknowledge the native practices of indigenous women and advocacy of women in vulnerable positions. Further research by the science community and analysis of environmental issues through a gendered lens are essential next steps for the UN and other governing bodies to curate policy that meets the needs of the women activists leading the environmental justice movement.

== Outer space ==
Over recent years social scientists have begun to view outer space in an environmental conceptual framework. Klinger, an environmental geographer, analyses the environmental features of outer space from the perspective of several schools of geopolitical. From a classical geopolitical approach, for instance, people's exploration of the outer space domain is, in fact, a manifestation of competing and conflicting interests between states, i.e., outer space is an asset used to strengthen and consolidate geopolitical power and has strategic value. From the perspective of environmental geopolitics, the issue of sustainable development has become a consensus politics. Countries thus cede power to international agreements and supranational organizations to manage global environmental issues. Such co-produced practices are followed in the human use of outer space, which means that only powerful nations are capable of reacting to protect the interests of underprivileged countries, so far from there being perfect environmental justice in environmental geopolitics.

Human interaction with outer space is environmentally based since a measurable environmental footprint will be left when modifying the Earth's environment (e.g., local environmental changes from launch sites) to access outer space, developing space-based technologies to study the Earth's environment, exploring space with spacecraft in orbit or by landing on the Moon, etc. Different stakeholders have competing territorial agendas for this vast space; thus, the ownership of these footprints is governed by geopolitical power and relations, which means that human involvement with outer space falls into the field of environmental justice.

=== Activities on Earth ===
On Earth, the environmental geopolitics of outer space is directly linked to issues of environmental justice - the launch of spacecraft and the impact of their launch processes on the surrounding environment, and the impact of space-based related technologies and facilities on the development process of human society. As both processes require the support of industry, infrastructure, and networks of information and take place in specific locations, this leads to continuous interaction with local territorial governance.

==== Launches and infrastructures ====
Rockets are generally launched in areas where conventional and potentially catastrophic blast damage can be controlled, generally in an open and unoccupied territory. Despite the absence of human life and habitation, other forms of life exist in these open territories, maintaining the local ecological balance and material cycles. Toxic particulate matter from rocket launches can cause localized acid rain, plant and animal mortality, reduced food production, and other hazards.

Moreover, space activities result in environmental injustice on a global scale. Spacecraft are the only contributors to direct human-derived pollution in the stratosphere, which comes mostly from the launch activities of rich economies in the northern hemisphere, while the global north bears more of the environmental consequences.

Environmental injustice is further evidenced by the limited research into the effects on downstream human and non-human communities and the inadequate tracking of pollutants in ecological chains and environments.

==== Space-based technologies ====
While space-based technologies have been applied to tracking natural disasters and the spread of pollutants, access to these technologies and the monitoring of data is deeply uneven within and between countries, exacerbating environmental injustice. Further, the use of technology by powerful countries can even lead to the creation of policies and institutions in less privileged nations, changing land-use regimes to favor or disadvantage the survival of certain human groups. For example, in the decades following the publication of the first report on the use of satellite imagery to measure rainforest deforestation in the 1980s, several environmental groups rose to prominence and also influenced changes in domestic policy in Brazil.

== See also ==
- Carbon fee and dividend
- Climate resilience
- Degrowth
- Ecocide
- Ecological civilization
- Environmental anthropology
- Environmental archaeology
- Environmental contract
- Environmental crime
- Environmental dumping
- Environmental history
  - Environmental history of the United States
- Environmental Justice Foundation
- Environmental justice and coal mining in Appalachia
- Environmental racism in the United States
- Environmental philosophy
- Environmental sociology
- Equality impact assessment
- Extinction debt
- Fenceline community
- Global waste trade
- Green New Deal
- Greening
- Health equity
- Human impact on the environment
- List of environmental lawsuits
- Pollution is Colonialism
- Nativism
- Netherlands fallacy
- Political representation of nature
- Resource justice
- Rights of nature
- Rural Action – an organization promoting social and environmental justice in Appalachian Ohio
- Sustainable development
- Toxic 100
- Toxic colonialism
- Solarpunk
- Urban forest inequity

== Sources ==
- Cole, Luke W.; Foster, Sheila R. (2001). From the Ground Up: Environmental Racism and the Rise of the Environmental Justice Movement. NYU Press. ISBN 978-0-8147-1537-6.
- Klinger, Julie Michelle (2017). Rare Earth Frontiers: From Terrestrial Subsoils to Lunar Landscapes. Cornell University Press. ISBN 978-1-5017-1458-0.
- Martinez-Alier, Joan (2002). The Environmentalism of the Poor. doi:10.4337/9781843765486. ISBN 978-1-84376-548-6.
- McDonald, David A. (2002). Environmental Justice in South Africa. Juta and Company Ltd. ISBN 978-1-919713-66-3.
- Nixon, Rob (2011). Slow Violence and the Environmentalism of the Poor. Harvard University Press. doi:10.4159/harvard.9780674061194. ISBN 978-0-674-06119-4. JSTOR j.ctt2jbsgw. OCLC 754842110.
- Nixon, Rob (March 13, 2013) [2011]. Slow Violence and the Environmentalism of the Poor. Harvard University Press. ISBN 978-0-674-07234-3.
- Pellow, David Naguib (2007). Resisting Global Toxics: Transnational Movements for Environmental Justice. MIT Press. ISBN 978-0-262-26423-5.
- Schlosberg, David (2007). Defining Environmental Justice. doi:10.1093/acprof:oso/9780199286294.001.0001. ISBN 978-0-19-928629-4.
