= Cotabambas District =

Coordinates: 13°45′04″S 72°21′11″W

Cotabambas Quta Pampa
- District
- Interactive map of Cotabambas
- Country: Peru
- Region: Apurímac
- Province: Cotabambas
- Capital: Cotabambas

Government
  - Mayor: Nestor Ferro Meza

Area
  - Total: 331.96 km^{2} (128.17 sq mi)
- Elevation: 3,425 m (11,237 ft)

Population (2005 census)
  - Total: 4,248
  - Density: 12.80/km^{2} (33.14/sq mi)
- Time zone: UTC-5 (PET)
- UBIGEO: 030502

Cotabambas (Aymara Quta Pampa, meaning "plain of lakes") is one of the six districts of the Cotabambas Province in Peru.

== Geography ==
One of the highest peaks of the district is Ñiq'ita at approximately 4,600 m (15,100 ft). Other mountains are listed below:

- Aqchi Wachana
- Lamrasniyuq
- Llink'ini
- Maran Qalla
- Maw'ka Llaqta
- Muyu Muyu
- Puka
- Qucha Pata
- Qhillani
- Ranra Pata
- Runtu Uma
- Siqi K'illi
- T'uru Rumi
- Wallwa
- Wayllani

== Ethnic groups ==
The people in the district are mainly indigenous citizens of Quechua descent. Quechua is the language which the majority of the population (90.26%) learnt to speak in childhood, 9.58% of the residents started speaking using the Spanish language (2007 Peru Census).

== See also ==
- Qiwllaqucha
