= Tambobamba District =

Coordinates: 13°57′04″S 72°10′01″W

Tambobamba Tampu Pampa
- District
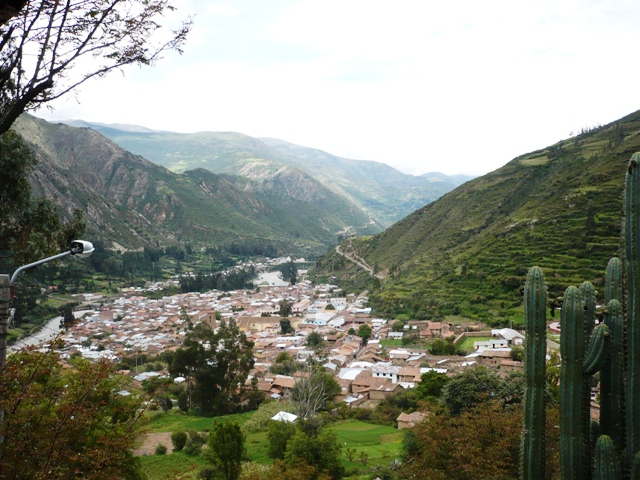
- Interactive map of Tambobamba
- Country: Peru
- Region: Apurímac
- Province: Cotabambas
- Founded: January 2, 1857
- Capital: Tambobamba

Government
  - Mayor: Lucio Dario Chauca Carrasco

Area
  - Total: 722.23 km^{2} (278.85 sq mi)
- Elevation: 3,250 m (10,660 ft)

Population (2005 census)
  - Total: 10,691
  - Density: 14.803/km^{2} (38.339/sq mi)
- Time zone: UTC-5 (PET)
- UBIGEO: 030501

Tambobamba (from Quechua Tampu Pampa, meaning "tambo plain") is one of the six districts of the Cotabambas Province in Peru.

== Geography ==
One of the highest peaks of the district is Willulluni at approximately 4,400 m (14,400 ft). Other mountains are listed below:

- Allpa Chaka
- Anta Pampa
- Aqu Uma
- Ayawa
- Chawpi Muqu
- Ch'aki Muqu
- Hatun Q'asa
- Hatun Sach'ayuq
- Ichhu
- Ichhu Muqu
- Ichhu Urqu
- Kallanka
- Kampanayuq
- Kiska
- Kiskayuq
- Luntu Marka
- Llallawa
- Lluqu Lluqu
- Mama Ñuñu
- Maran Pata
- Marka Raqay
- Misa Qaqa
- Pampa Wasi
- Parqa Sirk'a
- Pichaqani
- Pukar
- Q'illu Urqu
- Rayusqa
- Sankha
- Saywa
- Sikuwa
- Tika Pallanka
- Tikani
- Tinki
- Uma Warkusqa
- Urqu Wasi
- Wanq'u Pata
- Waylla Misa
- Waylla Q'asa
- Winchus
- Winku P'ukru
- Wisk'acha
- Yana Ranra

== Ethnic groups ==
The people in the district are mainly indigenous citizens of Quechua descent. Quechua is the language which the majority of the population (89.70%) learnt to speak in childhood, 10.11% of the residents started speaking using the Spanish language (2007 Peru Census).

== Climate ==
Climate data for Tambobamba, elevation 3,279 m (10,758 ft), (1991–2020)
Month	Jan	Feb	Mar	Apr	May	Jun	Jul	Aug	Sep	Oct	Nov	Dec	Year
Mean daily maximum °C (°F)	19.8 (67.6)	19.4 (66.9)	19.4 (66.9)	19.6 (67.3)	19.8 (67.6)	19.4 (66.9)	19.3 (66.7)	20.4 (68.7)	21.2 (70.2)	21.8 (71.2)	22.4 (72.3)	20.7 (69.3)	20.3 (68.5)
Mean daily minimum °C (°F)	8.0 (46.4)	8.0 (46.4)	7.8 (46.0)	7.0 (44.6)	5.3 (41.5)	4.0 (39.2)	3.6 (38.5)	4.6 (40.3)	6.4 (43.5)	7.4 (45.3)	7.9 (46.2)	7.9 (46.2)	6.5 (43.7)
Average precipitation mm (inches)	204.6 (8.06)	220.5 (8.68)	155.1 (6.11)	56.7 (2.23)	10.6 (0.42)	3.7 (0.15)	3.3 (0.13)	9.0 (0.35)	19.5 (0.77)	66.3 (2.61)	90.2 (3.55)	175.7 (6.92)	1,015.2 (39.98)
Source: National Meteorology and Hydrology Service of Peru
