= Qiwllaqucha (Cotabambas) =

Lake in Peru

- Location within Peru
- Location: Peru; Apurímac Region
- Coordinates: 13°52′14″S 72°18′53″W
- Surface elevation: 4,469 m (14,662 ft)

Qiwllaqucha (Quechua qillwa, qiwlla, qiwiña gull, qucha lake, "gull lake", hispanicized spelling Quiullacocha) is a small lake in Peru located in the Apurímac Region, Cotabambas Province, Cotabambas District, south-east of Cotabambas. It is situated at a height of about 4,469 metres (14,662 ft).
