= Mara District =

Mara District Distrito de Mara
- District
- Interactive map of Mara District
- Country: Peru
- Region: Apurímac
- Province: Cotabambas
- Founded: January 2, 1857
- Capital: Mara

Government
  - Mayor: Florentino Enriquez Ayquipa

Area
  - Total: 224.17 km^{2} (86.55 sq mi)
- Elevation: 3,770 m (12,370 ft)

Population (2005 census)
  - Total: 6,374
  - Density: 28.43/km^{2} (73.64/sq mi)
- Time zone: UTC-5 (PET)
- UBIGEO: 030505

Mara District is one of the six districts of the Cotabambas Province in Peru.

== Geography ==
One of the highest peaks of the district is Kuntur Kunka at approximately 4,400 m (14,400 ft). Other mountains are listed below:

- Aksu
- Huch'uy Miyu Kancha
- Mina Quri
- Puyaq
- Qaqa Marka
- Qucha Pata
- Suntu
- Tarawiri
- Willkani
- Yanama

== Ethnic groups ==
The people in the district are mainly indigenous citizens of Quechua descent. Quechua is the language which the majority of the population (94.45%) learnt to speak in childhood, 5.24% of the residents started speaking using the Spanish language (2007 Peru Census).

== See also ==
- Qañawimayu
