= Coyllurqui District =

Coordinates: 13°50′13″S 72°25′52″W

Coyllurqui
- District
- Interactive map of Coyllurqui
- Country: Peru
- Region: Apurímac
- Province: Cotabambas
- Founded: November 19, 1942
- Capital: Coyllurqui

Government
  - Mayor: Prof. Alfredo Cereceda Oroz

Area
  - Total: 418.95 km^{2} (161.76 sq mi)
- Elevation: 3,165 m (10,384 ft)

Population (2005 census)
  - Total: 7,909
  - Density: 18.88/km^{2} (48.89/sq mi)
- Time zone: UTC-5 (PET)
- UBIGEO: 030503

Coyllurqui District is one of the six districts of the Cotabambas Province in Peru.

== Geography ==
One of the highest peaks of the district is Chunta at approximately 4,600 m (15,100 ft). Other mountains are listed below:

- Ch'uwaña
- Hatun Sura
- Kimsa Quchayuq
- Luntu Marka
- Llaqtawi
- Pachakutiq
- Pichaqani
- Pillina
- Puka Q'asa
- Pukar
- Qantuyuq
- Q'asa Uqhu
- Q'illu Q'illu
- Q'iswa Chakana
- Runa Runayuq
- Silla Q'asa
- Willulluni

== Ethnic groups ==
The people in the district are mainly indigenous citizens of Quechua descent. Quechua is the language which the majority of the population (88.25%) learnt to speak in childhood, 11.29% of the residents started speaking using the Spanish language (2007 Peru Census).
