= Markansaya =

Archaeological site in Peru

- Location: Peru, Apurímac Region, Cotabambas Province

Markansaya or Hatun Markansaya (Quechua) is an archaeological site in Peru. It is located in the Apurímac Region, Cotabambas Province, Haquira District.
