= Tambobamba =

Tambobamba Tampupampa
- Town
- Location within Peru
- Coordinates: 13°51′23″S 72°08′37″W
- Country: Peru
- Region: Apurímac Region
- Province: Cotabambas Province
- District: Tambobamba District

Government
  - Mayor: Lucio Dario Chauca Carrasco
- Elevation: 3,250 m (10,660 ft)

Tambobamba (Quechua: Tampupampa 'Resting plain') is a town in the south-central Andes of Peru, the capital of Cotabambas Province, located at the easternmost end of the Department of Apurímac.

== Geography ==
It is located at 3,275 meters (10,745 ft) above sea level on the banks of the Palcaro River.

== History ==
Since March 10, 1960, it has been elevated to the provincial capital of Cotabambas.

== Politics ==
=== Municipal and Regional Administration ===
As the capital of the province of Cotabambas, the city is governed by the Provincial Municipality of Cotabambas, which has jurisdiction over the entire territory of the province. From 2011-2014, the provincial municipality was constituted by the mayor Guido Ayerve Quispe, the deputy mayor Ruth Paz Ccoricasa, and the councilors Juan Palma Quispe, Luis Ivan Cruz Puma, Soramayhua Peñalva Escobar, Antonia Huillca Hinostroza, Pedro Alejandro Osorio, and Dante Contreras Gayoso. At the departmental level, the position of regional councilor is assumed by Margot Cordova Escobar, who participates and presents projects on behalf of the province of Cotabambas to the assembly of the Regional Government of Apurímac.

== Economy ==
The agricultural production is typical of high-altitude areas, similar to that of nearby Grau Province.

== Communications and Transportation ==
Due to its high altitude, most of its settlements have easier access to Cusco, towards which the road leads.

== Public Services ==
=== Education ===
Tambobamba has an academic branch of the National University Micaela Bastidas.

=== Health ===
The district has a health facility located in the capital city, the Tambobamba Hospital. It has operating rooms, a maternity ward, consultation rooms, and laboratories. It serves approximately 200 patients and performs around 15 surgeries. In 2013, it suffered an avalanche, burying 90% of the facility.

== Heritage ==
=== Historical Heritage ===
Tambobamba Temple: A church built of adobe with a stone facade in baroque style, highlighting the image of the Virgin of Carmen.

=== Cultural Heritage ===
The main festivity of Tambobamba is the feast of the Virgin of the Assumption, during which bullfights with condors, cockfights, and performances by dancers and troupes take place.

Carnaval T'ikapallana: A festivity held in the town of Tambobamba, Peru, in February and March. It was declared a Cultural Heritage of the Nation by the Ministry of Culture.

== Climate ==
Climate data for Tambobamba, elevation 3,279 m (10,758 ft), (1991–2020)
Month	Jan	Feb	Mar	Apr	May	Jun	Jul	Aug	Sep	Oct	Nov	Dec	Year
Mean daily maximum °C (°F)	19.8 (67.6)	19.4 (66.9)	19.4 (66.9)	19.6 (67.3)	19.8 (67.6)	19.4 (66.9)	19.3 (66.7)	20.4 (68.7)	21.2 (70.2)	21.8 (71.2)	22.4 (72.3)	20.7 (69.3)	20.3 (68.5)
Mean daily minimum °C (°F)	8.0 (46.4)	8.0 (46.4)	7.8 (46.0)	7.0 (44.6)	5.3 (41.5)	4.0 (39.2)	3.6 (38.5)	4.6 (40.3)	6.4 (43.5)	7.4 (45.3)	7.9 (46.2)	7.9 (46.2)	6.5 (43.7)
Average precipitation mm (inches)	204.6 (8.06)	220.5 (8.68)	155.1 (6.11)	56.7 (2.23)	10.6 (0.42)	3.7 (0.15)	3.3 (0.13)	9.0 (0.35)	19.5 (0.77)	66.3 (2.61)	90.2 (3.55)	175.7 (6.92)	1,015.2 (39.98)
Source: National Meteorology and Hydrology Service of Peru
