= Haquira District =

Coordinates: 14°13′24″S 72°11′41″W

Haquira Jaqhira
- District
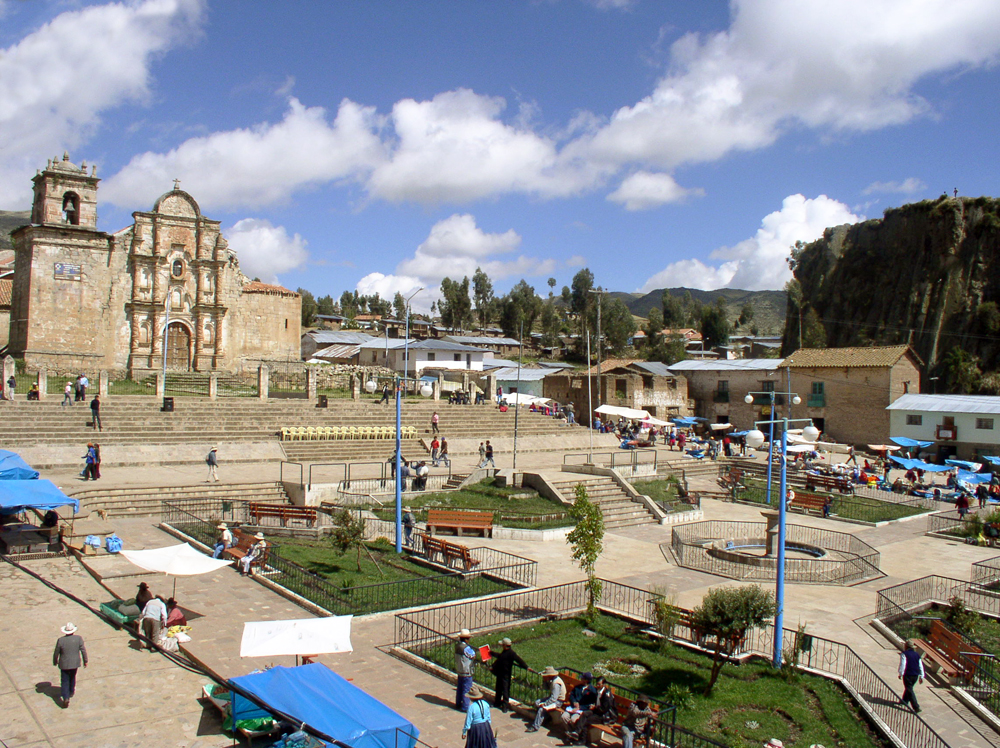
- Main square in Haquira
- Interactive map of Haquira
- Country: Peru
- Region: Apurímac
- Province: Cotabambas
- Founded: January 2, 1857
- Capital: Haquira

Government
  - Mayor: Rogelio Chahua Pacco

Area
  - Total: 475.46 km^{2} (183.58 sq mi)
- Elevation: 3,671 m (12,044 ft)

Population (2005 census)
  - Total: 10,593
  - Density: 22.279/km^{2} (57.704/sq mi)
- Time zone: UTC-5 (PET)
- UBIGEO: 030504

Haquira District is one of the six districts of the Cotabambas Province in Peru.

== Geography ==
One of the highest peaks of the district is Huch'uy Miyu Kancha at approximately 4,600 m (15,100 ft). Other mountains are listed below:

- Anka Wachana
- Chitayuq
- Inti Tiyana
- Kuntur Marka
- Laram Kancha
- Llawi Rumiyuq
- Minas Pata
- Parqa Kancha
- Parqa Urqu
- Pata Pampa
- Puka Qaqa
- Phiruru
- Qhawana Marka
- Surimana
- Taya Sirk'a
- Urpiyuq Phaqcha
- Waqra Q'asa
- Waraquyuq
- Winchus
- Yana Qutu
- Yana Waylla

== Ethnic groups ==
The people in the district are mainly indigenous citizens of Quechua descent. Quechua is the language which the majority of the population (91.26%) learnt to speak in childhood, 8.52% of the residents started speaking using the Spanish language (2007 Peru Census).

== See also ==
- Markansaya
- Qañawimayu
