= Barossa Gas Project =

Planned gas and oil field in Darwin, Australia

Barossa Gas Field
- Country: Australia
- Region: Darwin
- Coordinates: -9.725, 130.482
- Operator: Santos Limited

The Barossa Gas Project is an offshore gas and condensate oil field under construction by Santos Limited in Australian waters in the Timor Sea around 300 km (190 mi) north of Darwin in the Northern Territory. Upon completion in late 2025, it is estimated to be the most carbon-intensive gas development in Australia.

The project is intended to supply the Darwin LNG facility (DLNG) at Wickham Point, Middle Arm near Darwin, only the second facility of its kind in Australia. The Barossa Gas Project will replace the supply from the Bayu-Undan field where reserves were depleted in 2023. This required construction of a new 262 km pipeline, known as the Darwin Pipeline Duplication Project with a section of this running parallel to the existing Bayu-Undan to Darwin Pipeline. The gas will then be liquified at the DLNG and exported as LNG.

The project was initially accepted by the Commonwealth Government's independent regulator for offshore oil and gas development, the National Offshore Petroleum Safety and Environmental Management Authority (NOPSEMA) in March 2018. Santos bought ConocoPhillips' interest in the project in 2019. The pipeline was approved in March 2024 and was completed in 2025.

Worth at least A$4.7 billion, the project is expected to create around 600 jobs during construction and 350 ongoing jobs in Darwin over the following 20 years.

== Emissions and environmental impact ==
The Barossa Gas Project is approximately 33 km from the Oceanic Shoals Australian Marine Park. Three other federal government marine parks, including Ashmore Reef, are also in the vicinity. The project's pipeline runs through the traditional Sea Country the Larrakia and Jikilaruwu Tiwi Islands clan, who have significant cultural connection to it as well a dependency on it as a habitat for many marine species. They are particularly concerned about impact to the nesting areas of flatback and olive ridley turtles.

The project has been called a 'carbon bomb' due to its excessive future carbon emissions that will make it the most carbon-intensive gas development in Australia upon completion. The project is estimated to produce as much as 1.5 tonnes of CO_{2} for every tonne of LNG, leading the Institute for Energy Economics and Financial Analysis (IEEFA) to describe the project as an “emissions factory with a gas by-product”. A 2021 report suggested that emissions could be greatly reduced by the use of solar power by using Sun Cable's troubled Australia-Asia Power Link and/or carbon capture and storage (CCS), but the IEEFA found the project would continue to release financially risky carbon dioxide emissions at the site, onshore and across the whole supply chain.

In March 2023 the project was significantly impacted by the Australian Government's reform of the Safeguard Mechanism, a key part of its climate policy. The mechanism requires Australia's facilities with emissions above a given threshold (100ktCO2e), to keep their emissions at or below a prescribed "baseline". This baseline then declines generally at a rate of 4.9% per year to 2030 This would add estimated additional costs to the Barossa Gas Project of between A$500 million and A$987 million between now and 2030. Santos CEO Kevin Gallagher strongly opposed the changes to the Safeguard Mechanism claiming it would make the project unviable, directly lobbying the government to enable them to use carbon capture and storage to offset emissions. This would involve separating out the carbon dioxide from the gas at the Darwin LNG facility and piping it back to the Bayu-Undan field to be stored under the sea floor, essentially exporting it, as the field is in Timorese waters. Despite never having completed a similar project and known limitations to CCS technology at that scale, the Labor Government quickly passed the Environment Protection (Sea Dumping) Amendment (Using New Technologies to Fight Climate Change Bill, enabling the project to proceed, while leading opponents to call it 'the Santos Amendment'.

== Legal cases ==
=== South Korean banks case ===
In March 2022, leaders of the Larrakia and Jikilaruwu Tiwi Islands clan, the traditional owners of the sea country through which the pipeline will pass, launched a legal challenge that attempted to stop the South Korean state-owned Export-Import Bank of Korea (KEXIM) and the Korea Trade Group (K-Sure) from providing loans and guarantees of up to A$700 million for the project, thus preventing Santos from building the gas pipeline near Cape Fourcroy. However the case failed in the Seoul District Court.

=== Tipakalippa case ===
In June 2022, traditional owners of the Tiwi Islands filed a lawsuit supported by the Environmental Defenders Office (EDO) against Santos and the federal government, who they said had not properly consulted them. This was the first case in Australia challenging an offshore project approval because of lack of consultation with First Nations people. Munupi Senior Lawman and Tiwi Traditional Owner Dennis Tipakalippa argued that NOPSEMA, the federal offshore gas regulator, should not have approved Santos’ plans to drill the Barossa gas field due to the Santos' inadequate consultation. Concerned about the cultural and environmental impact of the project on traditional food sources, Santos has submitted an environmental impact plan, which includes the potential impact of an oil spill, and its plans for cleanup should one occur.

In September 2022 Judge Mordecai Bromberg found that NOPSEMA was "not lawfully satisfied that consultation had occurred", dismissing Santos’ environmental plan, thus invalidating its approvals for drilling. As a result, Santos had to disconnect its drilling rig from the sea north of Melville Island and leave the Barossa field by 6 October 2022.

In December Santos lost an appeal. NOPSEMA ordered Santos to stop construction on their pipeline to enable a cultural heritage survey to be done. Traditional owners then lodged human rights complaints against 12 banks including ANZ, Commonwealth Bank, Westpac, and NAB, over their involvement in the Barossa Gas Project again claiming a lack of consultation.

In May 2023, Resources Minister Madeleine King announced a review into offshore gas consultation requirements. In March 2024 a bill was introduced enabling the minister broader power to amend legislation or regulations without reference to national environmental standards, which was criticised for potentially threatening First Nations consultation rights that enabled the Tippakalippa case.

=== Munkara case ===
In October 2023, a group of 11 Tiwi traditional owners led by Simon Munkara of the Jikilaruwu clan, applied for an urgent injunction in the Federal Court of Australia to prevent Santos commencing work on the Barossa gas pipeline, claiming Santos has not properly assessed the underwater cultural heritage of the region. Santos claimed the applicant was motivated by environmental ideals rather than genuine risk to cultural heritage, citing disagreements concerning the validity and relevance of the traditional Dreaming or songlines pertaining to the area, the Crocodile Man and Ampiji in particular.

On 15 January 2024, the judge dismissed the case enabling Santos to resume laying its underwater pipeline. In her judgement, Justice Natalie Charlesworth stated their lawyers had engaged in manipulations and "a form of subtle witness coaching" requiring the applicants to pay Santos' legal costs. A review in May 2024 found the EDO did not breach the terms of a $8.2 million grant agreement between it and the federal government and there was "no evidence indicating potential fraud".

In April 2024, despite no direct involvement in any of the legal cases, Sunrise, Jubilee Australia and the NT Environment Centre were ordered to hand over documents to determine whether Santos will also pursue costs for the lawsuit carried out by the EDO on behalf of Tiwi Island traditional owners. This has been critiqued by human rights groups as potentially setting a precedent that the expression of support for fellow civil society groups and First Nations people involved in litigation might enable a fossil fuel company access to internal documents and open the risks of a claim of legal costs.
