= Challhuahuacho District =

Coordinates: 14°07′01″S 72°15′00″W

Challhuahuacho Challwa Wachu
- District
- Interactive map of Challhuahuacho
- Country: Peru
- Region: Apurímac
- Province: Cotabambas
- Founded: November 18, 1994
- Capital: Challhuahuacho

Government
  - Mayor: Porfirio Gutiérrez Paniura

Area
  - Total: 439.96 km^{2} (169.87 sq mi)
- Elevation: 3,698 m (12,133 ft)

Population (2017)
  - Total: 14,525
  - Density: 33.014/km^{2} (85.507/sq mi)
- Time zone: UTC-5 (PET)
- UBIGEO: 030506

Challhuahuacho (Quechua: Challwa Wachu, meaning 'fish ridge') is one of the six districts of the province Cotabambas in Peru. The town has 4,000 inhabitants with another 10,000 in the surrounding area of Challhuahuacho.

== Geography ==
One of the highest peaks of the district is Anka Tapana at approximately 4,800 m (15,700 ft). Other mountains are listed below:

- Anka Tapana
- Chakata
- Ch'uwañuma
- Huch'uy Miyu Kancha
- Kallanka
- Kunturi
- K'ark'a Q'ara
- Llallawa
- Llulluch'a Urqu
- Millpuq
- Muru Urqu
- Parqa Parqa
- Pata Pampa
- Pichaqani
- Puka Qaqa
- Pukar
- Phiruru
- Qaqa Kancha
- Q'asa
- Q'umir Qaqa
- Taya Sirk'a
- Tika Pallanka
- T'akra
- Wamanripayuq
- Waqra Waqra
- Waywaylla
- Willkarana
- Wiska
- Yana Urqu

== Ethnic groups ==
The people in the district are mainly indigenous citizens of Quechua descent. Quechua is the language which the majority of the population (87.57%) learnt to speak in childhood, 12.11% of the residents started speaking using the Spanish language (2007 Peru Census).
