= Cotabambas province =

Coordinates: 13.942°S 72.181°W

Cotabambas
- Province
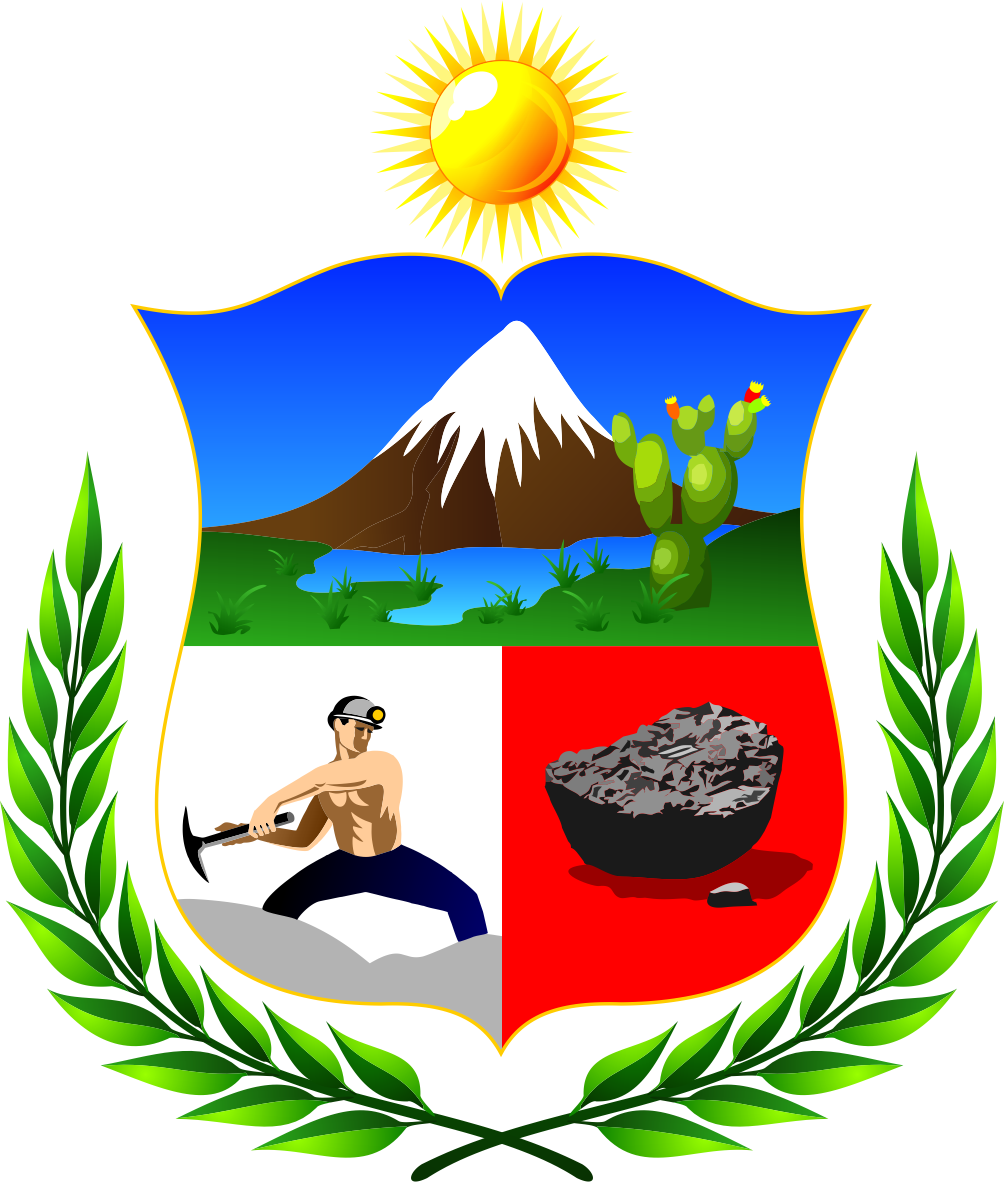
- Flag Coat of arms

- Location of Cotabambas in the Apurímac Region
- Country: Peru
- Region: Apurímac
- Capital: Tambobamba

Area
  - Total: 2,612.72 km^{2} (1,008.78 sq mi)

Population
  - Total: 44,028
  - Density: 16.851/km^{2} (43.645/sq mi)

Cotabambas is a province located in the Apurímac Region of Peru. The province has a population of 44,028 inhabitants. The capital of this province is the city of Tambobamba.

== Boundaries ==
- North: Cusco Region
- East: Cusco Region
- South: Cusco Region
- West: provinces of Abancay, Grau and Antabamba

== Geography ==
One of the highest peaks of the province is Wiska at approximately 4,800 m (15,700 ft). Other mountains are listed below:

- Anka Wachana
- Aqchi Wachana
- Chunta
- Ch'uwañuma
- Huch'uy Miyu Kancha
- Jaqhira Sirka
- Kunturi
- Limaq
- Llulluch'a Urqu
- Llulluch'ayuq
- Millpuq
- Ñiq'ita
- Parqa Urqu
- Pukar
- Phiruru
- Quña Quta
- Qhawana Marka
- Qhillani
- Q'iswa Chakana
- Q'umir Qaqa
- Sipita
- Surimana
- Taya Sirk'a
- T'akra
- Wamanripayuq
- Waqra Waqra
- Waraquyuq
- Winku P'ukru

== Political division ==
The province extends over an area of 2,612.72 square kilometers (1,008.78 sq mi) and is divided into six districts:

- Tambobamba
- Cotabambas
- Coyllurqui
- Haquira
- Mara
- Challhuahuacho

== Ethnic groups ==
The people in the province are mainly indigenous citizens of Quechua descent. Quechua is the language which the majority of the population (90.18%) learnt to speak in childhood, 9.55% of the residents started speaking using the Spanish language and 0.17% using Aymara (2007 Peru Census).

== See also ==
- Markansaya
- Qiwllaqucha
