= List of environmental lawsuits =

On this page, environmental lawsuit means "a lawsuit where the well-being of an environmental asset or the well-being of a set of environmental assets is in dispute". Also on this page, lawsuit with environmental relevance means "a lawsuit where a non-environmental entity or a set of non-environmental entities is in dispute, but whose outcome has relevance for an environmental asset or for a set of environmental assets".

Because the distinction between the two types of lawsuit is not clearly defined, it is beneficial to keep the two lists together on one page, but separated according to that distinction.

== Environmental lawsuits ==
| Lawsuit(s) | Environmental asset(s) and subject(s) of lawsuit(s) | Court(s) of decision(s) | Year(s) of decision(s) |
|---|---|---|---|
| A-G v Geothermal Produce | General environment: pollution from pesticide spray | Court of Appeal of New Zealand | 1987 |
| Alaska Dept. of Environmental Conservation v. EPA | Air: authority to overrule state decisions about technology | Supreme Court of the United States | 2004 |
| Aldred's Case | Aesthetics: smell from pig sty | | 1610 |
| Allison, et al. v. ExxonMobil Corp, et al. | Land and aquifers: gasoline leak from service station | | 2009 |
| Amchem Products Inc. v. British Columbia (Workers' Compensation Board) | Workplace: asbestos | Supreme Court of Canada | 1993 |
| American Electric Power Company v. Connecticut | Climate: greenhouse gas emissions | Supreme Court of the United States | 2011 |
| Anderson v. Cryovac | Water: toxic contamination | United States Court of Appeals for the First Circuit | 1986 |
| Baltimore Gas & Elec. Co. v. Natural Resources Defense Council, Inc. | General environment: production and disposal of nuclear fuel | Supreme Court of the United States | 1983 |
| Bates v. Dow Agrosciences LLC | Crop of peanuts: damage by pesticide | Supreme Court of the United States | 2005 |
| Boomer v. Atlantic Cement Co. | Aesthetics: dirt, smoke, and vibration | New York Court of Appeals | 1970 |
| Burmah Oil Co. v Lord Advocate | Oil fields: destruction during World War II | Courts of Scotland | 1965 |
| Cardwell v. American Bridge Co. | Waterways: common highways | Supreme Court of the United States | 1885 |
| Castlemaine Tooheys Ltd v South Australia | Recycling: bottle deposit | High Court of Australia | 1990 |
| Central Green Co. v. United States | Land: meaning of "flood or flood waters" | Supreme Court of the United States | 2001 |
| Chemical Waste Management, Inc. v. Hunt | Cleanliness: interstate importation fee for disposal of hazardous waste | Supreme Court of the United States | 1992 |
| Chevron U.S.A., Inc. v. Natural Resources Defense Council, Inc. | Air: emissions from new equipment and total emissions from plant | Supreme Court of the United States | 1984 |
| Citizens to Preserve Overton Park v. Volpe | Parkland: highway routing | Supreme Court of the United States | 1971 |
| City of Philadelphia v. New Jersey | Cleanliness: interstate importation of waste | Supreme Court of the United States | 1978 |
| Climate change litigation and the California Environmental Quality Act | General environment: climate change | | |
| Cline v. American Aggregates Corporation | Water in aquifer: pollution | Supreme Court of Ohio | 1984 |
| Coeur Alaska, Inc. v. Southeast Alaska Conservation Council | Water: gold mine waste disposal in Lower Slate Lake | Supreme Court of the United States | 2009 |
| Colorado River Water Conservation District v. United States | Water: supply | Supreme Court of the United States | 1976 |
| Commonwealth v Tasmania | Water: hydroelectric dam on Gordon River | High Court of Australia | 1983 |
| Compagnie Francaise de Navigation a Vapeur v. Louisiana Board of Health | General environment: quarantine | Supreme Court of the United States | 1902 |
| Department of Transportation v. Public Citizen | Air: pollution from international transport | Supreme Court of the United States | 2004 |
| Dolan v. City of Tigard | Land: paving a parking lot, and providing a greenway and a pedestrian and bicycle pathway | Supreme Court of the United States | 1994 |
| Duke Power Co. v. Carolina Environmental Study Group | Workplace: nuclear accidents | Supreme Court of the United States | 1978 |
| Edwards v National Coal Board | Land: preventing accidental rock fall in coal mine | | 1949 |
| Entergy v. Riverkeeper | Water: cooling water intakes for power plants | Supreme Court of the United States | 2009 |
| Environment Agency v Clark | Land: compliance with landfill licence terms | | |
| Environmental Defence Society v New Zealand King Salmon | General environment: salmon farming | Supreme Court of New Zealand | 2014 |
| Environmental Defense v. Duke Energy Corporation | Air: emissions in relation to modifications to power plants | Supreme Court of the United States | 2007 |
| Ernst v. EnCana Corporation, 2013 ABQB 537 | Aquifer: contamination from hydraulic fracturing | | |
| Exxon Shipping Co. v. Baker | Water and land: compensation for victims of oil spill | Supreme Court of the United States | 2008 |
| Federal Power Commission v. Tuscarora Indian Nation | Water: hydroelectric power from Niagara Falls | Supreme Court of the United States | 1960 |
| Friends of the Earth, Inc. v. Laidlaw Environmental Services, Inc. | Water: industrial pollution of North Tyger River | Supreme Court of the United States | 2000 |
| Gade v. National Solid Wastes Management Association | Workplace: hazardous waste materials | Supreme Court of the United States | 1992 |
| Geer v. Connecticut | Wildlife: interstate transportation of wild fowl | Supreme Court of the United States | 1896 |
| Gillingham Borough Council v Medway (Chatham) Dock Co Ltd | Soundscape: noise pollution | High Court of Justice | 1992 |
| Greenpeace v. Eni | General environment: climate change | Civil Court of Rome | 2024 |
| Hadacheck v. Sebastian | Aesthetics: pollution from manufacture of clay bricks | Supreme Court of the United States | 1915 |
| Haida Nation v. British Columbia (Minister of Forests) | Forests: duty to consult Aboriginal groups before exploiting resources | Supreme Court of Canada | 2004 |
| Stephanie Hallowich, H/W, v. Range Resources Corporation | General environment: pollution from hydraulic fracturing | Court of Common Pleas of Washington County, Pennsylvania (Civil Division) | 2011 |
| Hanousek v. United States | Water and land: oil spill from ruptured pipeline | United States Court of Appeals for the Ninth Circuit | 1999 |
| Held v. Montana | Effect of climate change on youth | First Judicial District Court, Lewis and Clark County, Montana; Montana Supreme Court | 2023-2024 |
| Hornbeck Offshore Services LLC v. Salazar | Water: offshore drilling | United States federal courts | ongoing |
| Hughes v. Oklahoma | Wildlife: federal legislation | Supreme Court of the United States | 1979 |
| Illinois Central Railroad v. Illinois | Submerged land: construction by railroad company | Supreme Court of the United States | 1892 |
| Indiana Harbor Belt Railroad Co. v. American Cyanamid Co. | Land and water: acrylonitrile spilled from train | United States Court of Appeals for the Seventh Circuit | 1990 |
| Industrial Union Department v. American Petroleum Institute | Workplace: exposure to benzene | Supreme Court of the United States | 1980 |
| Interprovincial Cooperatives v. The Queen | Water: interprovincial river pollution | Supreme Court of Canada | 1975 |
| Kansas v. Colorado | | Supreme Court of the United States | 1902, 1907, 1943, 1995, 2001, 2004, 2009 |
| Kivalina v. ExxonMobil Corporation | Climate: destruction of a community by climate change | United States federal courts | 2009 |
| Kleppe v. New Mexico | Wildlife: horses and burros | Supreme Court of the United States | 1976 |
| Koontz v. St. Johns River Water Management District | Wetlands: development and mitigation | Supreme Court of the United States | 2013 |
| Kruger and al. v. The Queen | Wildlife: hunting of deer by Aboriginals out of season | Supreme Court of Canada | 1978 |
| Kvikk case | Electromagnetic radiation: congenital disorders | | |
| Lighthiser v. Trump | Air: Donald Trump executive orders promoting fossil fuels | U.S. District Court, District of Montana | 2025 |
| Los Angeles County Flood Control District v. NRDC | Water: pollution from stormwater | Supreme Court of the United States | 2013 |
| Lucas v. South Carolina Coastal Council | Coastland: erecting homes | Supreme Court of the United States | 1992 |
| Lujan v. Defenders of Wildlife | Wildlife: geographical limits of a section of the Endangered Species Act of 1973 | Supreme Court of the United States | 1992 |
| Lyng v. Northwest Indian Cemetery Protective Association | Forests: road building and timber harvesting | Supreme Court of the United States | 1988 |
| M. C. Mehta v. Kamal Nath | Water and land: land encroachment causing swelling of Beas River and washing away of land | Supreme Court of India | 1997 |
| M. C. Mehta v. Union of India | Air: pollution causing a hazard to community of Delhi | Supreme Court of India | |
| Maine v. Taylor | Fisheries: interstate importation of fish | Supreme Court of the United States | 1986 |
| Massachusetts v. Environmental Protection Agency | Air: regulation of greenhouse gases | Supreme Court of the United States | 2007 |
| McCastle v. Rollins Environmental Services | General environment: disposal of hazardous waste | | 1987 |
| McLaren v. Caldwell | Waterways: common highways | Judicial Committee of the Privy Council of the United Kingdom | 1884 |
| Metropolitan Edison Co. v. People Against Nuclear Energy | General environment: restarting reactor | Supreme Court of the United States | 1983 |
| Missouri v. Holland | Wildlife: hunting migratory waterfowl | Supreme Court of the United States | 1920 |
| Missouri, Kansas, & Texas Railway Company of Texas v. Clay May | Land: weed propagation | Supreme Court of the United States | 1904 |
| Monsanto Canada Inc. v. Schmeiser | Farmland: deliberate propagation of canola contaminated by genetically modified organisms | Supreme Court of Canada | 2004 |
| Monsanto Co. v. Geertson Seed Farms | Farmland: genetically modified alfalfa | Supreme Court of the United States | 2010 |
| Montreal (City) v. 2952-1366 Québec Inc. | Soundscape: invasive music | Supreme Court of Canada | 2005 |
| Morrison v. Olson | Land: Superfund law regarding hazardous waste | Supreme Court of the United States | 1988 |
| National Assn. of Home Builders v. Defenders of Wildlife | Water and wildlife: granting state authority over anti-pollution statutes | Supreme Court of the United States | 2007 |
| National Audubon Society v. Superior Court | Water: supply from Mono Lake | Supreme Court of California | 1983 |
| New Jersey v. Delaware | Water: liquefied natural gas pipeline | Supreme Court of the United States | 2008 |
| New York v. United States | General environment: disposal of radioactive waste | Supreme Court of the United States | 1992 |
| Newfoundland and Labrador v. AbitibiBowater Inc. | Land: remediation of expropriated mill property | Supreme Court of Canada | 2012 |
| Nollan v. California Coastal Commission | Coastland: erecting a house, and providing a public easement | Supreme Court of the United States | 1987 |
| North Shore City Council v Auckland Regional Council | Water in Auckland Region: urban development | Environment Court of New Zealand | 1996 |
| Norton v. S. Utah Wilderness Alliance | Wilderness: preservation | Supreme Court of the United States | 2004 |
| Nulyarimma v Thompson | Water: mining company draining Lake Eyre | Federal Court of Australia | 1999 |
| Operation Dismantle v. The Queen | General environment: military tests increasing risk or nuclear war | Supreme Court of Canada | 1985 |
| Oregon Waste Systems, Inc. v. Department of Environmental Quality of Oregon | Cleanliness: interstate disposal of waste | Supreme Court of the United States | 1994 |
| Overseas Hibakusha Case | Electromagnetic radiation at natural levels: health-care benefits for hibakusha | Supreme Court of Japan | 1957, 1968, 1974, 1978, 1995, 2003, 2005 |
| Palazzolo v. Rhode Island | Wetlands: development | Supreme Court of the United States | 2001 |
| Palila v. Hawaii Department of Land and Natural Resources | Wildlife: introduced species (goats and sheep) | United States Court of Appeals for the Ninth Circuit | 1981 |
| Partridge v Crittenden | Wildlife: advertising brambling cocks and hens | Queen's Bench Division of the High Court of England and Wales | 1968 |
| People v. the Brooklyn Cooperage Company | Forests: logging in Adirondack Park | New York Supreme Court, Appellate Division | 1906 |
| PUD No. 1 of Jefferson County v. Washington Department of Ecology | Water: hydroelectric power from Dosewallips River | Supreme Court of the United States | 1994 |
| R v Stephens | Water: quarry refuse dumped into river | Queen's Bench Division | 1866 |
| R (Jackson) v Attorney General | Wildlife: hunting foxes and hares | House of Lords of the United Kingdom | 2005, 2006 |
| R. v. Badger | Wildlife: hunting by Aboriginals on private land | Supreme Court of Canada | 1996 |
| R. v. City of Sault Ste-Marie | Water: locating a waste disposal site near a stream | Supreme Court of Canada | 1978 |
| R. v. Crown Zellerbach Canada Ltd. | Water: ocean dumping | Supreme Court of Canada | 1988 |
| R. v. Hydro-Québec | Water: dumping polychlorinated biphenyls (PCBs) into the St. Maurice River | Supreme Court of Canada | 1997 |
| R. v. Jim | Wildlife: hunting by Aboriginals on Indian reserves | British Columbia Supreme Court | 1915 |
| R. v. Van der Peet | Fisheries: Aboriginal fishing rights extending to selling | Supreme Court of Canada | 1996 |
| Rapanos v. United States | Wetlands: filling with sand | Supreme Court of the United States | 2006 |
| Rio Grande Silvery Minnow v. Bureau of Reclamation | Wildlife: irrigation damaging endangered species | U.S. 10th Circuit Court of Appeals | 2010 |
| Rylands v Fletcher | Water and land: reservoir flooding adjacent land | House of Lords of the United Kingdom | 1868 |
| Ryuichi Shimoda v. The State | General environment: atomic bombs damaging Hiroshima and Nagasaki | District Court of Tokyo | 1963 |
| S. D. Warren Co. v. Maine Board of Environmental Protection | Water: hydroelectric dams discharging into Presumpscot River | Supreme Court of the United States | 2006 |
| Save the Plastic Bag Coalition v. The City of Manhattan Beach | General environment: plastic bags | Supreme Court of California | 2011 |
| Scenic Hudson Preservation Conference v. Federal Power Commission | Aesthetics and conservation: construction of power plant | United States Court of Appeals for the Second Circuit | 1965 |
| Sierra Club v. Babbitt | Endangered species: high-density housing | United States District Court for the Southern District of Alabama | 1998 |
| Sierra Club v. Morton | Parkland: development | Supreme Court of the United States | 1972 |
| Slaughter-House Cases | Water: slaughterhouse waste | Supreme Court of the United States | 1873 |
| Solid Waste Agency of Northern Cook Cty. v. Army Corps of Engineers | Water: waste disposal | Supreme Court of the United States | 2001 |
| South Florida Water Management District v. Miccosukee Tribe | Wetlands (Everglades): pollution from storm water in canal | Supreme Court of the United States | 2004 |
| Sporhase v. Nebraska ex rel. Douglas | Water: exportation of water | Supreme Court of the United States | 1982 |
| St Catharines Milling and Lumber Co v R | Forests: land title | Judicial Committee of the Privy Council | 1888 |
| St. Louis v. Myers | Water: rights of landowners beside Mississippi River | Supreme Court of the United States | 1885 |
| Sterling v. Velsicol Chemical Corp | Water: disposal of waste from insecticide production | United States Court of Appeals for the Sixth Circuit | 1986, 1988 |
| Stop the Beach Renourishment v. Florida Department of Environmental Protection | Beaches: beach renourishment | Supreme Court of the United States | 2010 |
| Summers v. Earth Island Institute | Forests: sale of fire-damaged timber | Supreme Court of the United States | 2009 |
| Tahoe-Sierra Preservation Council, Inc. v. Tahoe Regional Planning Agency | Water: supply from Lake Tahoe Basin | Supreme Court of the United States | 2002 |
| Teitiota v Chief Executive Ministry of Business, Innovation and Employment | Environment of Kiribati: climate change and immigration | Court of Appeal of New Zealand | 2014 |
| Tennessee Valley Authority v. Hill | Habitat: destruction by hydroelectric dams | Supreme Court of the United States | 1978 |
| Tri-state water dispute | Water: supply from Lake Lanier | | undecided |
| Tsilhqot'in Nation v British Columbia | Forests: land title | Supreme Court of Canada | 2014 |
| Tuna-Dolphin GATT Case (I and II) | Marine biology: seine fishing | Panel of General Agreement on Tariffs and Trade and World Trade Organization | |
| United Haulers Assn. v. Oneida-Herkimer Solid Waste Mgmt. Auth. | Cleanliness: interstate exportation of waste | Supreme Court of the United States | 2007 |
| United States v. 50 Acres of Land | Land: compensation for replacing condemned landfill | Supreme Court of the United States | 1984 |
| United States v. Approximately 64,695 Pounds of Shark Fins | Fisheries: shark finning | United States Court of Appeals for the Ninth Circuit | 2008 |
| United States v. Bestfoods | Land: pollution from chemical manufacturing plant | Supreme Court of the United States | 1998 |
| United States v. Dion | Wildlife: American Indians hunting eagles | Supreme Court of the United States | 1986 |
| United States v. Locke | Water: regulation of maritime activity | Supreme Court of the United States | 2000 |
| United States v. Reserve Mining Company | Water (Lake Superior): tailings (i.e., mine waste) | United States district court in Minneapolis | 1974 |
| United States v. Riverside Bayview | Wetlands: placement of fill materials | Supreme Court of the United States | 1985 |
| United States v. SCRAP | Recycling: railroad freight rate | Supreme Court of the United States | 1973 |
| United States v. Washington | Fisheries: rights of Native Americans | United States District Court for the Western District of Washington | 1974 |
| United States v. Weitzenhoff | Water: ocean dumping | Ninth Circuit Court of Appeals | 1993 |
| United States v. Winans | Fisheries: Americans using a fish wheel to catch salmon | Supreme Court of the United States | 1905 |
| Utility Air Regulatory Group v. Environmental Protection Agency | Air: regulation of greenhouse gas emissions | United States Court of Appeals for the District of Columbia | 2012 |
| Vatican Radio lawsuit | Electromagnetic radiation: health effects from non-ionizing radiation | | |
| Vermont Yankee Nuclear Power Corp. v. Natural Resources Defense Council, Inc. | General environment: rulemaking, and environmental effects of the uranium fuel cycle | Supreme Court of the United States | 1978 |
| Verstappen v Port Edward Town Board | General environment: waste disposal | Durban and Coast Local Division | 1993 |
| Ward v. Canada (Attorney General) | Fishing and hunting: catching seals and selling their pelts | Supreme Court of Canada | 2002 |
| West Virginia v. EPA | Clean power plan issues | U.S. Court of Appeals | 2022 |
| Wheeler v Saunders Ltd | Aesthetics: smell from pig houses | Court of Appeal of England and Wales | 1994 |
| Whitman v. American Trucking Associations, Inc. | Air: ozone and particulate matter | Supreme Court of the United States | 2001 |
| Winter v. Natural Resources Defense Council | Biophony: navy sonar harming whales and other marine mammals | Supreme Court of the United States | 2008 |
| Winters v. United States | Water: rights of American Indians | Supreme Court of the United States | 1908 |
| Wisconsin v. Illinois | Water: supply from the Great Lakes | Supreme Court of the United States | 1929 |
| Wyoming v. Colorado | Water: supply from Laramie River | Supreme Court of the United States | 1922 |
| Yorta Yorta v Victoria | Land and water: rights of natives | Federal Court of Australia | 1998 |

== Lawsuits with environmental relevance ==
| Lawsuit(s) | Environmental asset(s) and subject(s) of lawsuit(s) | Court(s) of decision(s) | Year(s) of decision(s) |
|---|---|---|---|
| Adirondack League Club v. Sierra Club | General environment: trespassing during recreation | New York Court of Appeals | 1998 |
| Anglo-Iranian Oil Co. (United Kingdom v. Iran) | Oil fields: licence to extract oil | International Court of Justice of the United Nations, based in The Hague, Netherlands | 1952 |
| Arizona v. California | Water: supply from Colorado River | Supreme Court of the United States | 1931, 1934, 1936, 1963, 1964, 1968, 1979, 1983, 1984, 2000 and 2006 |
| Babbitt v. Sweet Home Chapter of Communities for a Great Oregon | Wildlife: interpretation of law protecting fish and wildlife | Supreme Court of the United States | 1995 |
| Baldwin v. Fish and Game Commission of Montana | Wildlife: elk hunting | Supreme Court of the United States | 1978 |
| Bamford v Turnley | Aesthetics: smoke from brick kiln | | 1860 |
| BG Checo International Ltd. v. British Columbia Hydro and Power Authority | Electromagnetic fields: terms regarding clearing of land | Supreme Court of Canada | 1993 |
| Bowman v. Monsanto Co. | Seeds: patent exhaustion | Supreme Court of the United States | 2013 |
| Bowoto v. Chevron Corp. | Oil fields (offshore): injuries and human rights violations | United States District Court for the Northern District of California | 2008 |
| Burford v. Sun Oil Co. | Oil fields: complex geology and multiple users | Supreme Court of the United States | 1943 |
| C&A Carbone, Inc. v. Town of Clarkstown, New York | Recycling: interstate exportation restriction | Supreme Court of the United States | 1994 |
| Carter v. Carter Coal Co. | Land: regulating the coal mining industry | Supreme Court of the United States | 1936 |
| Celotex Corp. v. Catrett | Workplace: asbestos exposure | Supreme Court of the United States | 1986 |
| Chemical Waste Management, Inc. v. United States EPA | General environment: hazardous waste (disposal and reporting) | | 1992 |
| Chilean–Peruvian maritime dispute | Water: sea border between Chile and Peru | International Court of Justice of the United Nations, based in The Hague, Netherlands | unresolved |
| Deepwater Horizon litigation | Water: Gulf of Mexico | | |
| Department of the Interior v. Klamath Water Users Protective Association | Water: federal legislation | Supreme Court of the United States | 2001 |
| Diamond v. Chakrabarty | Genetics and water: patent for GMO for cleaning oil spills | Supreme Court of the United States | 1980 |
| Dimmock v Secretary of State for Education and Skills | Climate: providing documentary An Inconvenient Truth (about climate change) to English state schools | High Court of Justice of England and Wales | 2007 |
| English v. General Electric | Workplace: work table contaminated with uranium | Supreme Court of the United States | 1990 |
| Farley v Skinner | Soundscape: aircraft noise | House of Lords of the United Kingdom | 2001 |
| Funk Brothers Seed Co. v. Kalo Inoculant Co. | Leguminous plants: patent for product for promoting nitrogen fixation | Supreme Court of the United States | 1948 |
| Georgia v. South Carolina (1990) | Water: interstate boundary | Supreme Court of the United States | 1990 |
| Hunt v. T&N plc | Workplace: asbestos exposure | Supreme Court of Canada | 1993 |
| Keystone Bituminous Coal Ass'n v. DeBenedictis | Land: coal mining causing damage to buildings, etc. | Supreme Court of the United States | 1987 |
| McLibel case | Water and rainforests: waste and destruction, respectively | European Court of Human Rights in Strasbourg, France | 2005 |
| Michigan v. EPA | General environment: pollution from power plants | Supreme Court of the United States | 2015 |
| Minister of Public Works v Kyalami Ridge Environmental Association | Conservation: housing for flood victims | Constitutional Court of South Africa | 2001 |
| Minnesota v. Mille Lacs Band of Chippewa Indians | Wildlife: hunting, fishing, and gathering rights | Supreme Court of the United States | 1999 |
| Pacific Gas & Electric Co. v. State Energy Resources Conservation and Development Commission | General environment: disposal of radioactive waste from nuclear reactors | Supreme Court of the United States | 1983 |
| Peevyhouse v. Garland Coal & Mining Co. | Land: restoration after coal mining | Supreme Court of Oklahoma | 1962 |
| Pennsylvania Coal Co. v. Mahon | Land: coal mining under a habitation | Supreme Court of the United States | 1922 |
| People of the State of California v. Federal Housing Finance Agency | General environment: energy-related property improvements | United States District Court for the Northern District of California | |
| R. v. Marshall | Fisheries: right of Aboriginals to catch and sell eels | Supreme Court of Canada | 1999 |
| RJW & SJW v The Guardian newspaper & Person or Persons Unknown | Environment of Ivory Coast: publishing toxic waste dumping | | 2009 |
| Rindge Co. v. County of Los Angeles | Land: expropriation for highway | Supreme Court of the United States | 1923 |
| Sackett v. Environmental Protection Agency | Wetlands: fill material for building a house | Supreme Court of the United States | 2012 |
| Solar Century Holdings Ltd v Secretary of State for Energy and Climate Change | General environment: support for solar power | Court of Appeal of England and Wales | 2016 |
| State Farm Fire & Casualty Co. v. United States ex rel. Rigsby | General environment: false insurance claims after Hurricane Katrina | Supreme Court of the United States | 2016 |
| Train v. Natural Resources Defense Council, Inc. | Air: federal regulation of state emission limitations | Supreme Court of the United States | 1975 |
| Transco plc v Stockport Metropolitan Borough Council | Land: water pipe leaking and washing away land | | 2003 |
| Tulee v. Washington | Fisheries: rights of Native Americans | Supreme Court of the United States | 1942 |
| United States v. Causby | Biophony and scotobiology: aircraft flying low | Supreme Court of the United States | 1946 |
| United States v. Louisiana (1965) | Natural resources: entitlement to Gulf of Mexico seabed | Supreme Court of the United States | 1965 |
| United States v. Shoshone Tribe of Indians | Land: mineral and timber rights | Supreme Court of the United States | 1938 |
| United States v. Students Challenging Regulatory Agency Procedures | General environment: transport of raw materials and of recyclable materials | Supreme Court of the United States | 1973 |
| United States v. The Progressive | General environment: publishing the "secret" of the hydrogen bomb | | 1979 |
| Vaughan v Menlove | General environment: spontaneous ignition of hay, causing fire to spread to adjacent land | | 1837 |
| Village of Schaumburg v. Citizens for a Better Environment | Environmental protection: door-to-door solicitation | Supreme Court of the United States | 1980 |
| Wik Peoples v Queensland | Land: removal of land from Aboriginal reserve for bauxite mining | High Court of Australia | 1996 |
| Willson v. Black-Bird Creek Marsh Co. | Water: sailboat breaking through a dam | Supreme Court of the United States | 1829 |
| Wiwa v. Royal Dutch Shell Co. | Oil fields: human rights abuses | United States District Court for the Southern District of New York | 2009 |
| Yarmirr v Northern Territory | Water: native title to seas, sea-bed and sub-soil | Federal Court of Australia | 2001 |

== See also ==
=== Environment courts ===
- Environment Court of New Zealand
- Kunming § Environmental court (in People's Republic of China)
- Land and Environment Court of New South Wales
- Livability Court

=== Other related topics ===
- 2006 Côte d'Ivoire toxic waste dump § Lawsuit by victims
- Agent Orange § U.S veterans (class action environmental lawsuit)
- Armley asbestos disaster § Chase Manhattan Bank v T&N
- Armley asbestos disaster § Margereson v J.W. Roberts Ltd. and Hancock v J.W. Roberts Ltd.
- Bhopal disaster § Legal action against Union Carbide
- Black Bike Week § Noise limit faces lawsuit (class action environmental lawsuit)
- Bougainville Copper § US lawsuit (class action environmental lawsuit)
- Camelford water pollution incident § Legal actions against South West Water Authority (in Cornwall in England)
- Collision between MV Testbank and MV Sea Daniel
- Conservation Law Foundation (CLF) (in New England in the US)
- Corby toxic waste case
- Deepwater Horizon litigation
- Dow Chemical Company § Nuclear weapons (class action environmental lawsuit)
- DuPont and C-8
- Environmental crime
- Environmental criminology
- Environmental impact assessment
- Environmental justice
- Environmental law
- Environmental racism
- Global warming controversy § Litigation (class action environmental lawsuit)
- Grazing rights in Nevada § Federal grazing legal cases
- Greenpeace Arctic Sunrise ship case
- International Court of Justice advisory opinion on the Legality of the Threat or Use of Nuclear Weapons
- International Network for Environmental Compliance and Enforcement (INECE)
- Kearl Oil Sands Project § Criticism (in Alberta in Canada)
- Keele Valley Landfill § Resident class action lawsuit (class action environmental lawsuit)
- Keystone Pipeline § Lawsuits
- Lac-Mégantic derailment § Litigation
- Lead contamination in Washington, D.C. drinking water § Class-action lawsuit (class action environmental lawsuit)
- Lindane § Morton Grove lawsuit
- List of environmental agreements
- List of environmental law reviews and journals
- List of environmental laws by country
- Mackenzie Valley Pipeline Inquiry
- Marine mammals and sonar § Court cases
- McCullom Lake, Illinois § Class action lawsuit (class action environmental lawsuit)
- Monsanto legal cases
- Niigata Minamata disease § Patients' lawsuit (in Japan)
- Organic Act of 1897 § Izaak Walton League lawsuit (in the United States)
- Pulp mill conflict between Argentina and Uruguay
- San Diego Gas & Electric (SDG&E)
- School District 36 Surrey § Environment (in British Columbia in Canada)
- Shannon, Quebec § Cancer cluster (in Canada)
- Startups, shutdowns, and malfunctions
- Syncrude § Greenpeace lawsuit
- TerraCycle § Legal issues
- Toxic tort
- U.S. Army Corps of Engineers civil works controversies (New Orleans) § Legal issues in New Orleans
- Water contamination in Crestwood, Illinois § Second class action lawsuit (class action environmental lawsuit)
- Water contamination in Crestwood, Illinois § Third class action lawsuit (class action environmental lawsuit)
