= RS Sjøfareren =

RS Sjøfareren is the largest lifeboat in use by the Norwegian organization Norwegian Society for Sea Rescue.

== History ==
Sjøfareren (meaning The Sea Farer) was built at the Smedvik Mekaniske Verksted A/S in Tjørvåg and launched in 1968.

During the period 1971–1978, she was equipped with a much more powerful radar than was standard in this type of boat. Out of the eleven men that served aboard the boat in that period, seven developed cancer and died of it (the last died in 2005). It is speculated that it was the increased radiation from the radar that caused it, similar to the later HNoMS Kvikk. During the period, Sjøfareren operated in the waters between Svalbard and Jan Mayen, which has led to speculations that it was used as a spy ship to gather intelligence of Soviet Navy movements. This has been rejected by both the Norwegian Intelligence Service as well as the Norwegian Society for Sea Rescue.

In the late 1980s, Sjøfareren was leased and repainted for use by the Norwegian Coast Guard as a fishery inspection vessel. It was only in April 2002 that she again was painted in the traditional colours of the Norwegian Society for Sea Rescue. Sjøfareren was removed from service with Redningsselskapet in 2004 and renamed "Ringasund". As of 2026 it's still in use as salvage vessel.

== Resources ==
- (in Norwegian) Dagbladet, "Seven out of eleven got cancer"
- (in Norwegian) Dagbladet, Sjøfareren was not conducting intelligence missions
- (in Norwegian) Redningsselskapet, RS Sjøfareren back in our colours
