= HNoMS Kvikk =

Two ships of the Royal Norwegian Navy have borne the name HNoMS Kvikk or Kvik (archaic spelling), after the Norwegian word for agile, deft, fast, jaunty, nimble, quick, quickly, rapid, sharp, slippery, vivacious:

- HNoMS Kvik was a 2.-class torpedo boat launched in 1898.
- HNoMS Kvikk (P984) was a Snøgg-class patrol boat launched in 1970 and sold for scrapping in 1995.
