= Sterling v. Velsicol Chemical Corp. =

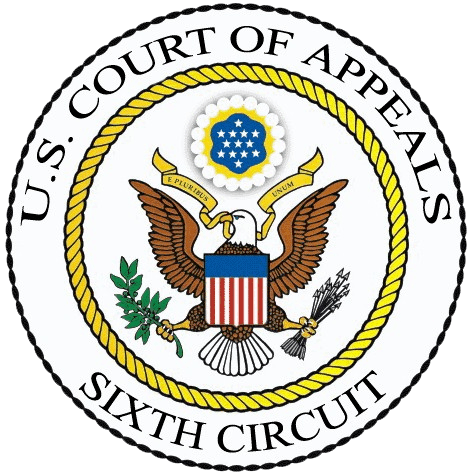
- Court: United States Court of Appeals for the Sixth Circuit
- Full case name: Woodrow Sterling, et al. v. Velsicol Chemical Corporation
- Decided: August 29, 1988
- Citations: 855 F.2d 1188; 27 ERC 1985; 55 USLW 2719; 11 Fed.R.Serv.3d 213; 18 Envtl. L. Rep. 20,978, 19 Envtl. L. Rep. 20,404; 26 Fed. R. Evid. Serv. 1037

Case history
- Prior history: 647 F. Supp. 303 (W.D. Tenn. 1986)

Court membership
- Judges sitting: Pierce Lively, Nathaniel R. Jones, Ralph B. Guy, Jr.

Case opinions
- Majority: Guy, joined by Lively
- Concurrence: Jones

Sterling v. Velsicol Chemical Corp., 855 F.2d 1188 (6th Cir. 1988), was an environmental lawsuit filed by citizens of Hardeman County, Tennessee, led by Steven Sterling, who sued Velsicol Chemical Corporation for contaminating their water supply through improper disposal of toxic chemicals.

== Background ==
In August 1964, Velsicol Chemical Corporation acquired 242 acres (0.98 km^{2}) of rural land in Hardeman County, Tennessee. Velsicol used the site as a landfill for by-products from the production of chlorinated hydrocarbon insecticides at its Memphis, Tennessee, chemical manufacturing facility. Before Velsicol purchased the landfill site and commenced depositing chemicals into the ground, it neither conducted hydrogeological studies to assess the soil composition underneath the site, the water flow direction, and the location of the local water aquifer, nor drilled a monitoring well to detect and record any ongoing contamination. From October 1964 to June 1973, the defendant deposited a total of 300,000 55-gallon steel drums containing ultrahazardous liquid chemical waste and hundreds of fiber board cartons containing ultrahazardous dry chemical waste in the landfill.

Shortly after Velsicol began its disposal operations at the landfill site, local residents and county, state, and federal authorities became concerned about the environmental impact of their activities. As a result of this concern, the United States Geological Survey (USGS), in 1967, prepared the first of several reports on the potential contamination effects of the chemicals deposited into the landfill up to that time. The 1967 report indicated that chlorinated hydrocarbons had migrated down into the subsoil and had contaminated portions of the surface and subsurface environment adjacent to the disposal site. While the chemicals had not reached the local water aquifer, the USGS concluded that both the local and contiguous ground water were in danger of contamination.

State authorities increasingly became concerned about Velsicol's disposal of ultrahazardous chemicals at the site. In 1972, the state filed an administrative action to close the landfill because the chlorinated hydrocarbons buried at the site allegedly were contaminating irreparably the subsurface waters. The state ordered Velsicol to cease disposal of all toxic chemicals by August 21, 1972, and all other chemicals by June 1, 1973.

== U.S. District Court case ==
In 1978, forty-two plaintiffs sued Velsicol in the Circuit Court of Hardeman County, Tennessee, for damages and an injunction. The complaint sought $1.5 billion in compensatory damages and $1 billion in punitive damages. Velsicol had the case moved to the United States District Court for the Western District of Tennessee, seeking a diversity of citizens based on the amount of damages being sought. All but fifteen of the original forty-two plaintiffs then settled their claims. Plaintiffs' counsel filed an amended complaint for damages and an injunction and added forty-seven new plaintiffs to the original lawsuit.

The complaint sought relief for involuntary exposure to certain chemical substances known to cause cancer, affect the central nervous system and permanently damage other organs of the human body, and for loss of value to their real property in the region affected by the chemicals.

The district court found Velsicol liable to the plaintiffs on legal theories of strict liability, common law negligence, trespass, and nuisance. The court concluded that the defendant's hazardous chemicals, which escaped from its landfill and contaminated plaintiffs' well water, were the proximate cause of the representative plaintiffs' injuries. The district court awarded the five individuals compensatory damages totaling $5,273,492.50 for their respective injuries, plus prejudgment interest dating back to July, 1965, of $8,964,973.25. All damages, except for $48,492.50 to one plaintiff for property damage claims, were awarded for personal injuries. The district court also awarded $7,500,000 in punitive damages to the class as a whole.

== Appeal ==
Velsicol appealed the decision to the 6th Circuit Court of Appeals on the basis that the District Court certified the case as a class action under Rule 23(b)(3). Velsicol argued that individual issues, such as proximate cause and damages, predominated over common issues, so that the District court erred in its classification. The Appeals Court ruled that as long as the defendant's liability can be determined on a class-wide basis because the cause of the disaster is a single course of conduct which is identical for each of the plaintiffs. The Appeals Court reversed the District court's decision to defer its award punitive damages prior to determining compensatory damages for the entire class of 128 individuals; and remanded the recomputation of punitive damages

== Environmental damage ==
It was determined that spent hydrocarbons buried at the landfill disposal site included chlorobenzene, carbon tetrachloride, chloroformhexachlorobutadiene, hexachloroethane, hexachloronorbornadiene, naphthalene, tetrachloroethylene, toluene, hexachlorocyclopentadiene, and benzene. The drums and cartons containing these chemicals were deposited in trenches that were 15 feet (4.6 m) deep and 12 to 15 feet (4.6 m) wide and covered with approximately 3 feet (0.91 m) of soil. Velsicol took no precautions to insure the drums from bursting and, invariably, some of the drums would leak their contents into the soil. Furthermore, the trenches were neither lined nor covered with any impermeable material to prevent the chemical waste from leaking into the soil. Velsicol eventually placed a clay cap over the landfill site in 1980 only after state authorities threatened a lawsuit over the imminent danger the landfill posed to the environment.

== See also ==
- List of environmental lawsuits
