= Attorney-General v Geothermal Produce New Zealand Ltd =

- Court: New Zealand Court of Appeal
- Full case name: Her Majesty’s Attorney-General v Geothermal Produce New Zealand Limited & Goldie Applicators Limited
- Decided: 28 May 1987
- Citation: [1987] 2 NZLR 348
- Transcript: Court of Appeal judgment

Court membership
- Judges sitting: Cooke P, McMullin J, Somers J, Casey J

Attorney-General v Geothermal Produce New Zealand Ltd [1987] 2 NZLR 348 Is an important case in New Zealand regarding cases involving negligence, more specifically regarding foreseeability of loss and the duty to mitigate loss.

== Facts ==
Geothermal Produce grew roses in one greenhouse heated by geothermal steam. From the revenue generated from that greenhouse, Geothermal had plans in the future to build 3 more greenhouses to grow roses in.

Unfortunately for Geothermal, on 13 April 1980, just as the flowers had gotten to the stage to be cut and exported, Goldie Applicators Limited, a weed spraying contractor, under the instructions of the Department of Lands and Survey who were in charge of managing Crown land directly across the road from Geothermal's greenhouse, sprayed the toxic chemical 245T, to control the noxious plant broom, with the contractor spraying as close to 30 feet away from Geothermal's greenhouse. At some point the spray drifted into the ventilation system of the greenhouse, which resulted in the loss of the entire rose crop.

At the time, the NZ Government was aware that the greenhouse was near the spraying area, as well as being aware of Geothermal's plans for the three new greenhouses.

Geothermal waited 8 months before they removed the dead roses (to see if they recovered) Aside from that delay, Geothermal also faced further delay in restarting the business (by replanting). Due to their business loss, they did not have the capital to immediately pay to replant the flowers.

However, the director of Geothermal had substantial land holdings, which he could have either sold, or mortgaged to have immediately restarted the business, but chose not to do so.

In an effort to limit its liability, the NZ Government lent Geothermal $99,000 in September 1980 via the DFC and, a year later, in October 1981, $91,734 via the Crown Law Office. As these amounts did not cover the trade creditors, and so did not help Geothermal restart their business, a judge referred to these loans as "too little, too late", as Geothermal needed $250,000 to replant the lost flowers.

Ultimately, the flowers were only replanted under a new company, part owned by the NZ Government. Geothermal sued the Attorney General (effectively suing the government) for damages of $2,034,000 for the loss of the rose crop and the loss of future earnings, including the 3 greenhouses that had been planned to be built.

The High Court ruled that even though that the Department of Lands did not spray the chemical themselves, and despite the negligence being on the part of their independent contractor Goldie Applicators, the Department was just as liable for damages on 4 grounds:

1. Negligence, as they owed Geothermal a Duty of Care

2. Also held the department vicariously liable for negligence, as the spraying was in a dangerous or extra hazardous operation (the department was aware of the nearby greenhouse), that the department should have had a staff member supervise the spraying (which they did not).

3. Nuisance, as spraying in the vicinity of a greenhouse was an unwarranted and unreasonable use of crown land.

4. Held that the Department be liable under the Rylands v Fletcher principle.

The High Court of New Zealand found both the Department of Lands and Goldie Applicators Limited negligent for the loss and awarded Geothermal reduced damages of $667,000.

The Attorney General appealed to the New Zealand Court of Appeal.

== Judgment ==
In the Court of Appeal, the Crown appealed that they were liable for negligence and were unsuccessful. The crown's appeal then proceeded to the amount of damages awarded, on the following grounds:

Foreseeability of loss – the Crown argued that the future 3 greenhouses were not foreseeable i.e. they claimed that they did not know they were planned to be built. The court ruled that such a scenario was foreseeable, but one judge went as far as noting that the crown was aware of these plans through the planning process.

Impecunity – the Crown argued that they should not be liable for damages due to impecunity as they claimed that the company was insolvent at the date of the spraying. The court disagreed, saying the company was not insolvent, merely its finances were stretched.

Failure to mitigate loss – the Crown argued that damages awarded due to Geothermal delaying replanting the flowers because of lack of finance, should not be awarded on the grounds that the Managing Director Mr MacLachlan had land he could or either sold or mortgaged to of financed the immediate replanting of the flowers, which he declined to do. The court ruled that the director had no duty to risk his assets under such circumstances.

However, the Crown did have one small victory, as the court vacated the $38,000 in illusionary damages for predicted raise in costs to build the three greenhouses in the future.

== See also ==
- List of environmental lawsuits
