= Environmental dumping =

Shipment of waste from one country to another

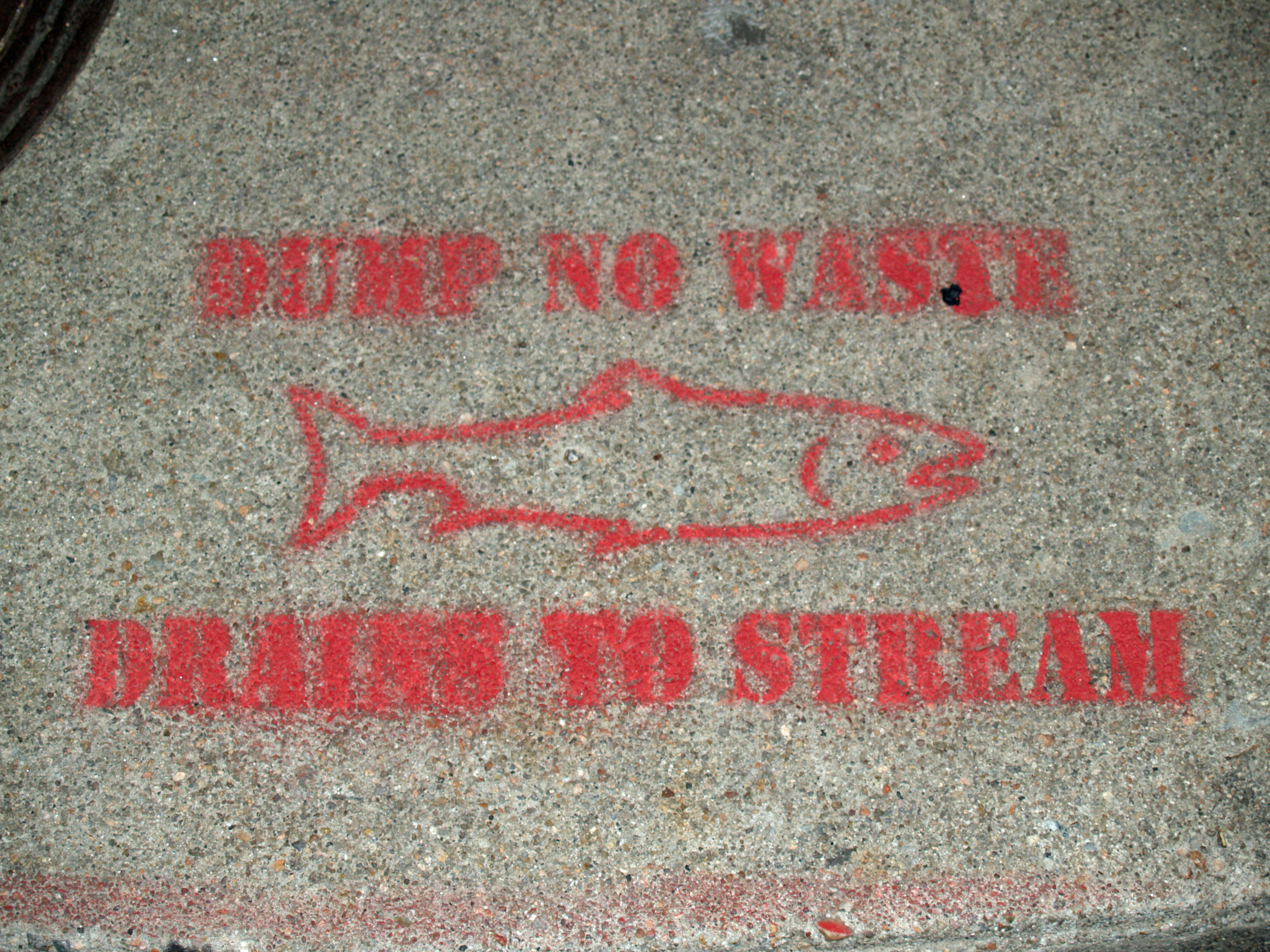
A spray-painted sign above a sewer in Colorado Springs, Colorado, warning people to not pollute the local stream by dumping.

Environmental dumping can refer to two distinct but interrelated types of dumping: One is the trans-frontier shipment and improper disposal of hazardous waste (household waste, industrial/nuclear waste, etc.), and the second is environmentally harmful product dumping, the unethical marketing in and exporting to developing countries of new products that are inferior in economic, environmental, and technical performance, with these products often requiring the use of obsolete and/or hazardous chemicals. The export of used products (commercial buses and trucks, heavy equipment) with poor energy-efficiency and environmental performance also falls into this category of dumping as does products that are at or near end-of-life. In all cases, the goal is to take advantage of countries with less strict environmental laws or environmental laws that are not well-enforced. The economic benefit of this practice is cheap disposal or recycling of waste outside of the economic and environmental regulations of the country of origin or the maximization of revenue from old products that are unwanted or not permitted for sale in the country of origin.

The dumping of hazardous waste has been possible because less-developed countries often did not: 1) know what entering the country through importers, 2) know the hazards and trade-offs, 3) have the enforcement structure in place to apprehend and halt imports, or 4) possess the political consensus and necessary independence to look out for their own national interests.

With the industrialization and globalization of China and other developing countries, environmental dumping can involve both developing and developed countries as origin and destination. Now, environmental harmful product dumping is analogous to economically harmful price dumping controlled under the World Trade Organization (WTO), which occurs when goods and services are sold in the importing country at prices below the selling price and/or cost of production in the country of export.

An example of an attempt at environmental dumping is the story of the decommissioned French aircraft carrier, the FS Clemenceau, which was originally sold to a ship breaking yard in Gujarat, India, to be demolished and recycled as scrap. The Indian Supreme Court ruled in 2006 that it could not enter Indian waters due to the high level of toxic waste and 700 tons of asbestos present on the ship, forcing the French government to take the Clemenceau back. The ship was subsequently blocked from entering the Suez Canal for the same reason. In 2009, the task of recycling the vessel was ultimately taken over by specialist recyclers at Hartlepool in the United Kingdom.

== The Evolution of Transfrontier Dumping of New Products and Hazardous Waste ==
The modern definition of environmental dumping has necessarily evolved beyond transboundary toxic waste dumping to include “the exporting of new and used products to another country or territory that:

1. Contain hazardous substances,
2. Have environmental performance lower than is in the interest of consumers or that is contrary to the interests of the local and global commons, or
3. Can undermine the ability of the importing country to fulfill international environmental treaty commitments."

== Transfrontier Waste ==
Transfrontier waste is shipped within the European Union (EU) and between the European Union and other countries. Typically, this waste is non-hazardous (metals, plastics, and paper products) and is traded by Organization for Economic Co-operation and Development (OECD) countries. OECD countries exported an estimated 4 to 5 million tons of metal and paper waste and nearly a half-million tons of recovered plastics in 2007. However, some of these transported wastes can be hazardous waste, with potential health risks to humans and the environment. According to the Basel Convention, at least 8 million tons of hazardous waste are imported and exported every year.

Created in 1989 with rule enforcement beginning in 1992, the Basel Convention aims to control the import and export of hazardous waste throughout the EU. While imperfect, the convention has reduced the shipment of illegal waste. In May 2005, 60 containers were seized that were on their way from the United Kingdom to China. The containers seized by Dutch authorities were supposed to be for paper but actually contained household wastes. Since neither the UK, China, nor Dutch had agreed to the importation of the wastes, the waste was shipped back. The Basel Convention also deals with the popular growing issue of E-waste. The Waste Shipment Regulation confirms what can be shipped to, from, and between EU countries. These regulation rules divide waste into three separate lists: Green List, Amber List, and Red List.

- Green List: These items are considered to be non-hazardous and more environmentally friendly. Some of these items may include paper and plastic that can be recycled. Shipments of green list materials do not require permission to cross international waters and can be shipped to parts of the EU.
- Amber List: Materials on this list can containing both non-hazardous and hazardous components. These materials can contain metal-bearing wastes, organic and inorganic wastes, and/or organic or inorganic constituents. A company or country shipping these items must have prior consent before exporting the materials. As of 2007, consent for the shipment of waste is received by Dublin City Council.
- Red List: This list includes reasonably hazardous materials that can be principally organic or inorganic, including polychlorinated biphenyls (PCBs).

== Ocean dumping ==
Shipment of waste from country to country can also involve dumping waste into the ocean. Ocean dumping has been a problem since the 19th century. In the United States, it was legal to dump industrial waste into the ocean until the Ocean Dumping Act was passed in 1972. From 1970–1980 alone, an estimated 25 million tons of waste including scrap metal, chemicals, and acids were dumped into the ocean. Ocean dumping can lead to eutrophication, which depletes the oxygen from the water, in turn killing marine life. Ocean dumping is placed into three lists: Gray List, Black List, and White List.

- Gray List: Includes water with highly toxic contaminants such as arsenic, lead, acids, nickel, chromium, scrap metals, and low-level radioactive materials.
- Black List: Includes mercury, cadmium, plastic, oil products, radioactive waste, and anything that is solely made for biological and chemical warfare. The materials on this list are highly potent and hazardous.
- White List: The white list contains every other material not already mentioned in the above lists. This list is used to make sure nothing will be dumped into the ocean and disturb or damage the coral reef ecosystems.

The most recent example of hazardous waste being dumped into the ocean occurred along Côte d'Ivoire in Africa in 2006. Hundreds of tons of waste product were dumped into the ocean from a ship by the name of Probo Koala. The ship was chartered by an international oil trader in the Netherlands. The incident precipitated a health crisis, affecting the health of 100,000 people in the vicinity. The oil trader (Trafigura) paid 200 million dollars to help with cleanup. The owner of the local company that was responsible for disposing the chemicals in various places was given 20 years in jail.

New regulations on the shipment of hazardous and non-hazardous materials were implemented in the EU in 2007. These regulations state tat the EU will no longer be able to export their hazardous wastes to developing countries that do not have the capabilities to deal with the waste in an environmentally friendly way. E-waste, such as computers, cannot be shipped to countries that are not in the EU or the European Free Trade Association (EFTA). States and countries that are members of the EU or EFTA must conduct inspections periodically to make sure that all regulations are being followed and must physically check containers to verify that the containers hold only what is authorized. Finally, if the country that is taking the waste is unable to accept or dispose of the waste then the sender must pay to take their waste back.

== Ship dismantling ==
Ship dismantling is another form of transfrontier waste that is shipped from country to country. Many ships are broken down into parts that can be recycled. Many parts of the ships are hazardous and can potentially pollute the areas that they are broken down in. The ship parts can contain asbestos, PCB's, and oil sludge. All these components can be a potential health risk and harm the environment. Most ship scrapping industries are in developing countries where the laws (environmentally as well as occupationally) are not as strict as in developed countries. International Maritime Organization states that India is the leader in ship dismantling, followed by China, Bangladesh, and Pakistan.

The aircraft carrier Clemenceau was denied access to Indian waters because it contained asbestos. The French aircraft was carried from France to Britain to be recycled on February 8, 2009, despite the abundance of asbestos.

The EU Commission proposed improvements to be made to improve the ship dismantling as well as the ocean dumping process on November 19, 2008. Public consultations were held in 2009, and stakeholder workshops were organized between 2009 and 2011. On March 26, 2009, the EU Parliament adopted a resolution on the Communication that was adopted by the Commission on October 21, 2009.

The European Council's Conclusions endorse the Hong Kong Convention on environmentally responsible ship recycling, adopted in May 2009. According to the International Maritime Organization, he Hong Kong Convention “intends to address all the issues around ship recycling, including the fact that ships sold for scrapping may contain environmentally hazardous substances such as asbestos, heavy metals, hydrocarbons, ozone-depleting substances and others. It also addresses concerns raised about the working and environmental conditions at many of the world's ship recycling locations.”

== The Montreal Protocol strategy to stop harmful product dumping ==
In the context of refrigeration and air conditioning equipment, increasingly necessary in a warming world, environmental dumping includes: “1) export of technology that cannot legally be sold in the country of export as a consequence of failure to meet environmental, safety, energy efficiency, or other product standards; and 2) export of technology that is unusable in the country of export because refrigerants are no longer available because of national regulation or phaseout and phasedown control schedules under the Montreal Protocol on Substances that Deplete the Ozone Layer”.

Transboundary toxic waste regimes are directed at managing and controlling transboundary shipments (including dumping in less-developed countries) of end-of-life equipment. In contrast, the Montreal Protocol is designed to top-down phaseout the production and consumption of ozone-depleting substances (ODS) – such as chlorofluorocarbons (CFCs), halons, hydrochlorofluorocarbons (HCFCs), and methyl bromide; and phasedown the production and consumption of ozone-safe hydrofluorocarbons (HFCs), which are used in the manufacture of new products such as air conditioners, food processing equipment, heat pumps, and refrigerators that require an initial refrigerant charge at time of manufacture and then recharging to replace any refrigerant that has leaked.

Investigations conducted by NGOs CLASP and the Institute for Governance & Sustainable Development (IGSD) have documented widespread dumping of new, inefficient, and environmentally harmful room air conditioning appliances in Africa (2020), Southeast Asia (2023), and Latin America and the Caribbean (2025). A case study published in Duke Environmental Law & Policy Forum in 2022 describes Ghana's efforts to stop product dumping of new but obsolete cooling equipment by multinational companies and the harms inflicted on buyers and communities. The greater electricity use of inefficient appliances drives higher electricity demand from power plants burning fossil fuels, which worsens air pollution. Personal and community funds that could otherwise be spent locally on education, housing, nutrition, and other goods and services supporting family quality of life and community prosperity are instead spent on electric bills. A comprehensive resource guide by IGSD describes the history of environmentally harmful dumping of cooling equipment and progress made toward ending this practice.

Environmental dumping especially hinders attempts under the Montreal Protocol to control ozone-depleting and climate-forcing chemical substances and/or products requiring unnecessarily high energy consumption. While developing country Parties to the Montreal Protocol are allowed to delay their phasedown of climate-forcing and ozone-depleting hydrofluorocarbons (HFCs) during a multi-year grace period consistent with the principal of common but differentiated responsibilities and respective capabilities, there are advantages to earlier implementation when superior alternatives are already available at reasonable costs, as is the case for many uses of HFCs today.

=== Decision of the Parties to the Montreal Protocol addresses dumping of cooling appliances (2022) ===
To strengthen the Montreal Protocol, Ghana on behalf of all African States parties to the Montreal Protocol proposed a Decision that the Montreal Protocol Parties negotiated and adopted as Decision XXXIV/4 at the Meeting of the Parties to the Montreal Protocol in November 2022. Decision XXXIV/4 invites parties that have restricted the manufacture and/or import of certain refrigeration, air-conditioning and heat pump products and equipment containing or relying on controlled substances, including with respect to energy efficiency, and that do not want to receive such products and equipment from other parties against payment or free of charge, to submit specific information to the Secretariat of the Montreal Protocol for discussion and consideration at the Forty-Fifth Open-Ended Working Group (OEWG) and Thirty-Fifth Meeting of the Parties (MOP) in 2023.

In parallel, the Montreal Protocol Parties reached Decision XXXIV/3 that requests the Montreal Protocol Technology and Economic Assessment Panel (TEAP) further investigate claims of environmentally harmful dumping of cooling equipment.

These decisions set the stage for further deliberation of and future decisions on the topic of preventing environmental dumping of inefficient cooling equipment containing or using high-GWP refrigerants with the ambition is to open markets to superior cooling appliances with savings in electricity cost spent locally.

== See also ==
- Chemical Waste Management, Inc. v. Hunt
- City of Philadelphia v. New Jersey
- Environmental justice
- Environmental protection
- Environmental racism
- Global environmental inequality
- Global waste trade
- NIMBY
- Pollution haven hypothesis
- Pollution in China
- Pollution is Colonialism
- Sacrifice zone
- Toxic colonialism
- Toxic waste dumping by the 'Ndrangheta
