= Maine v. Taylor =

- Supreme Court of the United States

Argued March 24, 1986 Decided June 23, 1986
- Full case name: Maine v. Taylor et al.
- Citations: 477 U.S. 131 (more) 106 S. Ct. 2440; 91 L. Ed. 2d 110; 1986 U.S. LEXIS 111

Case history
- Prior: United States v. Taylor, 585 F. Supp. 393 (D. Me. 1984); reversed, 752 F.2d 757 (1st Cir. 1985).

Holding
- States may prohibit the importation of out-of-state goods moving within the flow of commerce only if the prohibition serves a legitimate local concern and there are no other means of protecting that interest.

Court membership
- Chief Justice Warren E. Burger Associate Justices William J. Brennan Jr. · Byron White; Thurgood Marshall · Harry Blackmun; Lewis F. Powell Jr. · William Rehnquist; John P. Stevens · Sandra Day O'Connor

Case opinions
- Majority: Blackmun, joined by Burger, Brennan, White, Marshall, Powell, Rehnquist, O'Connor
- Dissent: Stevens

Laws applied
- U.S. Const. art. I, § 8

Maine v. Taylor, 477 U.S. 131 (1986), was a case in which the Supreme Court of the United States held that there was an exception to the "virtually per se rule of invalidity" of the dormant commerce clause. The Supreme Court of the United States found that a Maine law prohibiting the importation of out-of-state bait fish was constitutional because Maine authorities could not be certain that imported fish would be free of "parasites and nonnative species" that might pose environmental harm to local ecology. Discriminatory laws may be upheld only if they serve "legitimate local purposes that could not adequately be served by available nondiscriminatory alternatives," wrote Justice Blackmun, author of the majority opinion. In City of Philadelphia v. New Jersey, the Court had previously ruled that New Jersey's ban of out-of-state solid waste was facially discriminatory to the state's residents in a national market and was therefore overturned.

== See also ==
- Missouri, Kansas, & Texas Railway Company of Texas v. Clay May: 1904 case on invasive species
- List of United States Supreme Court cases, volume 477
