= Chemical Waste Management, Inc. v. United States EPA =

US environmental law case

Creating Chemical Waste Management, Inc. v. United States EPA: No. 88-1490 (First Argued March 6, 1989 – Finally Decided September 25, 1992) was a notable United States environmental law case involving the required reporting of safety breaches in management facilities along with reporting during interim period and reporting of unknown substances. The case began when Chemical Waste Management, Inc appealed its fine from the EPA for environmental health hazards to the US court in 1989 and appealed it twice.

== Background ==
Congress established the RCRA in 1976 to form an environmental regulation program that allowed for comprehensive involvement and more fluid adjustments to be made especially during interim periods.

Chemical Waste Management, Inc was a waste disposal company that was responsible for the safe and environmental management of hazardous materials. At the time there were several environmental safety standards in place enforced by the EPA. The EPA at the time required organizations and companies to make reports directly to the agency of any malfunctions or deteriorations of facilities. In addition in 1988 it established the requirement that facilities must report any materials that had leakages, even of unconfirmed substances, as hazardous materials until testing could further distinguish, and thus should be treated as such. The EPA also required disclosures of leakages and new hazards during interim periods of facilities' operations.

Chemical Waste Management, Inc had an on-site well-check system designed to test for any hazardous material leakage. It had a two part system check, although the EPA at the time had raised this requirement to three checks. Chemical Waste Management was in an interim stage where it had not installed the third check yet, but had not reached the required date of installment yet. Inspectors had found that an unidentified substance had been leaking out of a facility that was unreported and unknown to Chemical Waste Management. Chemical Waste Management failed to report these inspection findings of this interim period to the EPA.

When the EPA eventually found out about these violations, it fined the Chemical Waste Management for improper hazardous waste disposal. The fines were not significantly large, as the supposed violations had only been occurring for a short interim period. However, the EPA could fine firms and organizations up to $25,000 a day for the violation.

Chemical Waste Management believed that these fines were improper, since: 1. at the time the leakage substance was not considered hazardous, and 2. Chemical Waste Management had been on schedule to update its safety precautions.

== Case ==
In determining this case, the court brought into question if the EPA had correctly applied its regulations correctly to the Chemical Waste Management. The court believed that Chemical Waste Management was surely at fault for failing to report its faulty facilities as noted by inspectors. It was therefore its duty to report its breaches of environmental standards. The EPA at the time had a specific requirement that all notes made by inspectors were required to be reported to the agency itself even if the notes are not specifically linked to a malfunction or deterioration of facilities. It was found that Chemical Waste Management was in a state of non-compliance and violation for under six months.

The case was first brought to the US District court and ruled in favor of the EPA and was then sent to the Appellate court.

During the appeals, the court questioned whether the time frame of the petitioner's claim had expired, since it had made the standards change and it was no longer a question of enacting standards, but simply arguing past standards were unfairly put upon the organization. The court did not follow through with this claim, but it did aid in its final decision.

== Decision ==
The court held that the EPA was correct in enforcing these regulations upon Chemical Waste Management. It was reasonable to expect the firm to report leakage of a substance, although it was not considered hazardous. It also held that it was reasonable to expect Chemical Waste Management to especially report leakages that had breached the two check system and thus were in violation of the old requirements, regardless of it being in a transitional stage.

The court ruled in the EPA's favor, although the fine was significantly lower than before at $40,000, since Chemical Waste Management's violation had been minor, had little effect, and had been dealt with appropriately since the violation.

Both appeals to higher courts resulted in the same decision by the court, and the decision was made in favor of the EPA, finally resolved in 1992.

== Significance ==
This case outlined many protocols for environmental safety and health enforcement. It further requires disclosure from organizations as mandatory self-reporting regarding their malfunctions in facilities. Secondly it does not dismiss firms from environmental standards during interim periods of changing regulations. It also further solidifies the notion that unknown substance leakages are to be classified as environmental hazards until they can be accurately identified and controlled. The question of retroactivity does not strictly constitute retroactive lawmaking, since it was announced beforehand that new regulations would eventually be created and enforced.
