= Cline v. American Aggregates Corp. =

Supreme Court of Ohio case

Cline v. American Aggregates Corporation
- Seal of the Supreme Court of Ohio
- Court: Supreme Court of Ohio
- Full case name: Cline at al. v. American Aggregates Corporation
- Decided: December 31, 1984
- Citations: 474 N.E.2d 324 (OH 1984); 15 Ohio St.3d 384

Case history
- Prior action: 1983 WL 3735 (Ohio App. 10 Dist.)
- Subsequent actions: 582 N.E.2d 1 (Ohio App. 10 Dist. 1989) (affirmed); 550 N.E.2d 479 (OH 1990) (appeal dismissed)

Court membership
- Judges sitting: Frank D. Celebrezze; James P. Celebrezze; William B. Brown; A. William Sweeney; Ralph S. Locher; Clifford F. Brown; Robert E. Holmes

Case opinions
- Majority by James P. Celebrezze; Concurrence by Holmes

Cline v. American Aggregates Corporation, 474 N.E.2d 324 (OH 1984), was a case decided by the Supreme Court of Ohio that first applied the reasonable use doctrine to water use in that state.

== Factual background ==
The defendants operated a quarry, and as part of the process of extracting limestone, underground aquifers were dewatered. The plaintiffs on the neighboring land alleged that this dewatered and polluted their wells. The trial court granted summary judgment to the defendants on the authority of Frazier v. Brown, which allowed a landowner absolute use of the water on their land despite ramifications for neighboring landowners.

== Opinion of the Court ==
=== Majority opinion ===
The Supreme Court of Ohio rejected the absolute use rule in Frazier in favor of a reasonable use doctrine that allowed water use as long as it did not unreasonably harm neighbors that also had a right to the water. The court cited scientific advancements that allowed for better monitoring of water that could more easily determine how much water each landowner was entitled to. The reasonable use doctrine was adopted from § 858 of the Restatement of Torts, Second, which stated the following standard:

(1) A proprietor of land or his grantee who withdraws ground water from the land and uses it for a beneficial purpose is not subject to liability for interference with the use of water by another, unless

(a) the withdrawal of ground water unreasonably causes harm to a proprietor of neighboring land through lowering the water table or reducing artesian pressure,

(b) the withdrawal of ground water exceeds the proprietor's reasonable share of the annual supply or total store of ground water, or

(c) the withdrawal of the ground water has a direct and substantial effect upon a watercourse or lake and unreasonably causes harm to a person entitled to the use of its water.

=== Holmes' concurrence ===
Justice Holmes wrote separately to emphasize how the reasonable use doctrine provided flexible standards well suited to addressing modern problems associated with water usage.

== Subsequent history ==
The case was remanded to the Court of Appeals of Ohio, which affirmed the decision of the Supreme Court. An appeal from that ruling was dismissed by the Ohio Supreme Court.

== Impact ==
The reasonable use doctrine adopted in Cline has been codified in Ohio Revised Code § 1521.17.
