= Climate change litigation and the California Environmental Quality Act =

Litigation related to climate change and greenhouse gas (GHG) emissions has become increasingly common in federal and state courts. Following adoption of the Global Warming Solutions Act of 2006 (AB 32) and publication of the Intergovernmental Panel on Climate Change (IPCC) Fourth Assessment Report (AR4), additional pressure was placed on California public agencies to evaluate potential adverse effects to global climate change caused by GHG emissions. In particular, several lawsuits have been filed against agencies for failure to analyze GHG emissions generated by projects subject to the California Environmental Quality Act (CEQA). Court decisions prior to the 2010 revisions to the CEQA guidelines gave early insights as to how CEQA would be used as a vehicle to identify and mitigate GHG emissions within the state. Decisions issued after adoption of the revised guidelines are now being used to interpret CEQA's new requirement to evaluate GHG emissions and climate change.

== Background on the California court system ==
The California court system comprises 58 Superior Courts, six Courts of Appeal, and one Supreme Court. The Superior Courts of California are located in each county and preside over cases within their respective jurisdiction. The California Courts of Appeal hear Superior Court decisions on appeal. The highest state court, the Supreme Court of California, has discretion to review decisions made by lower courts. Cases brought before the Supreme Court are typically intended to resolve “important questions” related to state law.

The court system is hierarchical where decisions issued by higher courts set precedence for lower courts. For example, decisions of the California Supreme Court are binding on all Appellate and Superior Courts and decisions of Appellate Courts are binding on Superior Courts within the same district. The majority of climate change cases have been heard by Superior Courts; only a small number of cases have been reviewed by the Courts of Appeal and California Supreme Court.

== CEQA and climate change - statute background ==
The primary objective of CEQA is to disclose potential environmental impacts of activities proposed by state and local agencies. Unlike its federal counterpart, the National Environmental Policy Act, CEQA requires lead agencies to reduce potential impacts through the adoption of all feasible mitigation. Until recently, CEQA was silent on the issue of climate change and GHG emissions. However, the CEQA Guidelines were revised on December 30, 2009, requiring projects subject to CEQA consider potential environmental effects caused by GHG emissions. (Note: The Office of Administrative Law approved the revisions on February 16, 2010 and the new Guidelines took effect on March 18, 2010.) Section 15064.4 provides guidance for determining the significance of GHG emissions, but does not establish explicit thresholds. Section 15126.4(c) suggests general categories of acceptable mitigation.

In response to the CEQA guideline revisions, air districts and state agencies have published guidance documents to assist public agencies in addressing climate change impacts. To date, the Bay Area Air Quality Management District (BAAQMD) and San Joaquin Valley Air Pollution Control District (SJVAPCD) have adopted official thresholds of significance; the South Coast Air Quality Management District (SCAQMD) has adopted interim standards. The Governor's Office of Planning and Research (OPR) has released a technical advisory entitled CEQA and Climate Change: Addressing Climate Change through CEQA, which details a three-step analysis procedure for GHG emissions. The California Air Pollution Control Officers Association (CAPCOA) has also released an advisory document called CEQA and Climate Change, which discusses appropriate thresholds and evaluation approaches. The Attorney General has released a list of mitigation measures that should be considered for reducing GHG emissions, and CAPCOA has developed a guidance document describing methods for quantifying GHG emissions reductions achieved by mitigation measures.

== Challenges to CEQA documents ==
=== Early litigation prior to 2010 CEQA greenhouse gas guidelines (2006-2009) ===
Litigation related to climate change and CEQA began to surge following the State's adoption of AB 32 in 2006. Several early suits argued that scientific consensus regarding the threat of global warming and adoption of AB 32 required environmental documents now evaluate GHG emissions. Superior Courts typically upheld the validity of existing CEQA analyses, concluding that neither the passage of AB 32 nor the concept of climate change constitutes “new information” that would require subsequent environmental review—see American Canyon Community United for Responsible Growth et al. v. City of American Canyon et al. (May 2007) and Natural Resources Defense Council et al. v. Reclamation Board of the Resources Agency of the State of California (August 2007). (Note: CEQA Guidelines 15162 requires lead agencies prepare a subsequent environmental analysis if “new information of substantial importance” becomes available after adoption of the original environmental document.)

Early Superior Court decisions also saw arguments over the alleged speculative nature of climate change and lack of regulatory guidance. Petitioners in Santa Clarita Oak Conservatory v. City of Santa Clarita (August 2007) alleged that the City's Environmental Impact Report (EIR) was deficient in that it failed to consider the effect of climate change on water supply. However, the Los Angeles County Superior Court concluded that the “impact of climate change of water supply was too speculative to conduct a quantitative review.” A similar decision was issued by in Center for Biological Diversity v. City of Perris (August 2007). In Highland Springs v. City of Banning (January 2008), the Riverside County Superior Court held that “no law required the Banning City Council to consider global warming at the time it approved [the] project”. The court concluded that an evaluation of GHG emissions was therefore not required in the CEQA document.

The need for climate change analysis during CEQA review began a shift to the affirmative when several Superior Courts started to reject defenses based on inadequate regulatory guidance or speculation. In Center for Biological Diversity (CBD) v. City of Desert Hot Springs (August 2008), the Riverside County Superior Court held that the City must make a “meaningful attempt” to analyze GHG emissions before concluding that such an analysis would be speculative. A similar conclusion was reached by the Sacramento County Superior Court in Environmental Council of Sacramento v. California Department of Transportation (July 2008), which held that lack of a published significance threshold is not sufficient to forego a quantitative GHG analysis.

While these decisions were not precedent setting, they are significant in that they demonstrate a turning point in trial court opinions related to CEQA and climate change. The decisions set the stage for revisions to the CEQA guidelines, which made ignoring climate change during CEQA review no longer defensible.

=== Recent litigation following adoption of CEQA greenhouse gas guidelines (2010 to present) ===
The CEQA guidelines were revised on December 30, 2009 to require lead agencies identify and evaluate GHG emissions. Since publication of the revised guidelines, a few cases have been brought before the Court of Appeals regarding the adequacy of environmental review, including appropriate mitigation and thresholds.

The first significant published decision on GHG mitigation was Communities for a Better Environment (CBE) v. City of Richmond (April 2010, 184 Cal.App.4th 70). CBE sued the City over their EIR for proposed operational changes to an existing oil refinery. The Draft EIR concluded that GHG emissions would be less-than-significant with implementation of a reduction plan. CBE challenged the EIR on the grounds that the GHG analysis lacked basis and that the mitigation was improperly deferred. (Note: CEQA Guidelines Section 15126.4 states that “formulation of mitigation measures should not be deferred until some future time.”) The court agreed, stating that the EIR failed to disclose the basis for its GHG calculations and that the reduction plan gave no assurance that mitigation would actually be achieved. The court's decision affirms that GHG mitigation must be identified and well-defined prior to project approval.

The question of mitigation was raised again in Santa Clarita Organization for Planning the Environment (SCOPE) v. City of Santa Clarita (July 2011, 197 Cal.App.4th 1042). The City evaluated GHG emissions associated with the expansion of Memorial Hospital using the OPR's climate change guidance (see discussion under Statue Background, above). SCOPE sued, arguing that the City failed to adopt all mitigation outlined in OPR's guidance and that the significance conclusion lacked basis. The court held in favor of the City, stating that their analysis of GHG emissions was adequate and that incorporation of all 50 OPR measures would be unreasonable.

Litigation over appropriate thresholds for evaluating the significance of GHG emissions was brought before the Court of Appeals in Citizens for Responsible Equitable Environmental Development (CREED) v. City of Chula Vista (July 2011, 197 Cal.App.4th 327). CREED challenged the City's conclusion that the project would have a less-than-significant impact on climate change. CREED also alleged that use of AB 32 as a significance standard was inappropriate. The court held that the climate change analysis was adequate and that pursuant to CEQA Guidelines Section 15064.4, lead agencies have discretion to select their threshold of significance.

The question of whether CEQA requires lead agencies to evaluate climate change impacts on projects was recently addressed in Ballona Wetlands Land Trust (Ballona) v. City of Los Angeles (December 2011, 201 Cal.App.4th 455). Ballona alleged that the City failed to address impacts of sea level rise on the proposed project. The court upheld the City's EIR, stating that while an EIR must analyze environmental effects that may result from a project, it is not required to examine the effects of the environment on the project. In its opinion, the Court criticized the CEQA Guidelines that suggest lead agencies should consider the impact of the environment on the project, such as Section 15065(a)(4), which requires lead agencies to make a finding of significance for projects that cause “substantial adverse effects on humans beings, either directly or indirect.”

== Challenges to legislation ==
Although seemingly counter-intuitive, a lawsuit was filed against the California Air Resources Board (CARB) over implementation of the cap-and-trade program proposed under AB 32. In Association of Irritated Residents (AIR) v CARB, AIR alleged that CARB failed to provide an analysis of alternatives to cap-and-trade in its "functional equivalent document" for the AB 32 Scoping Plan. AIR also argued that the cap-and-trade program, as proposed, would disproportionally impact low-income communities. Central to AIR's claim was that stationary sources in low-income communities may increase emissions through the purchase of emissions allowances. By filing suit against CARB, AIR sought an injunction against the cap-and-trade program.

Upon review, the San Francisco Superior Court issued a ruling to halt implementation of the cap-and-trade program. The court held that CARB failed to adequately consider alternatives to cap-and-trade and that the environmental analysis lacked basis. On May 20, 2011, California Superior Court Judge Ernest Goldsmith issued a formal order enjoining CARB from implementing the cap-and-trade program until it completed an adequate environmental analysis. The California Attorney General appealed Judge Goldsmith's injunction, and on June 24, 2011, the Court of Appeals granted CARB's petition for a "writ of supersedeas." This decision effectively overturned the Superior Court's injunction, enabling CARB to continue with cap-and-trade rule making. Environmental justice advocates petitioned the California Supreme Court to reverse the "writ of superseades", but the petition was denied on September 28, 2011.

In response to the lawsuit, CARB prepared a supplemental CEQA equivalent document to the AB 32 Scoping Plan evaluating alternatives to cap-and-trade. The document was approved by the San Francisco Superior Court on December 6, 2011. The cap-and-trade regulations took effect on January 1, 2012.

== Attorney general settlements ==
The California Attorney General has had an influential role in recent climate change litigation. Through the use of settlements and other agreements, the Attorney General has resolved several disputes related to climate change analyses in CEQA documents. In 2007, the Attorney General entered into its first climate change settlement with San Bernardino County. The State of California sued the County, alleging that their recent General Plan failed to consider (among other things) appropriate GHG mitigation. The Attorney General settlement resulted in the incorporation of GHG mitigation in the County's General Plan.

A settlement with ConocoPhillips was also reached in 2007. On May 18, 2007, the Attorney General filed an appeal with the Contra Costa Board of Supervisors stating that ConocoPhillips's EIR for the Clean Fuels Expansion Project did not appropriately address GHG emissions. To resolve this dispute and enable the project to move forward, the parties entered into a settlement with the Attorney General that required ConocoPhillips purchase carbon offsets.

In 2008, the City of Stockton entered into a memorandum of understanding (MOU) with the Attorney General and Sierra Club to resolve ligation over its 2035 General Plan. The Sierra Club initially filed a petition for a writ of mandate, alleging that the City's EIR for the General Plan did not adequately address increases in GHG emissions. A Climate Action Plan (CAP) was required (amongst other items) as part of the MOU.

Other agreements have been made with the Port of Los Angeles (2007) and the San Diego Airport (2008). A summary of major settlements reached to-date, including key actions and their current status, are presented in the below table.

Case	Key Settlement Actions	Status
San Bernardino County, 2007	Update General Plan to include GHG inventory and reduction plan	Completed (2007)
	Set GHG emissions reduction targets	Completed GHG Reductions Plan
ConocoPhillips, 2007	Surrender operating permit for Santa Maria Refinery	Plant closed down in 2007
	Pay Bay Area Air Quality Management District $7 million in carbon offsets	Made payment to BAAQMD (2009)
	Pay Audubon Society $200,000 in carbon offsets	N/A
	Pay California Wildfire ReLeaf $2.8 million in carbon offsets	N/A
Port of Los Angeles, 2007	Conduct an annual inventory of GHG emissions	Inventory efforts underway
	Construct a 10 megawatt solar array	Project underway, expected completion in 2013
San Diego Airport, 2008	Develop a GHG emissions reduction plan	GHG inventory report was developed in 2008
City of Stockton, 2008	Prepare a CAP	Draft CAP completed (2012)
	Establish GHG and VMT reduction targets	Included in Draft CAP
	Develop a green building ordinance and program	Green Building Ordinance and Green-Up Stockton completed (2011/2012)
	Complete transit studies and program	Completed and included in the Draft CAP
	Establish infill/downtown requirements	In development

== Criticisms ==
Critics have argued that climate change litigation under CEQA has been time-consuming and expensive. Considered as one of the most controversial lawsuit by some critics, San Bernardino County v State of California was opposed by several local governments and industries for these very reasons. For example, many Republican senators feared that the lawsuit would set precedent for new GHG analyses that would limit future development. As a result, some senators sought to obtain a “prohibition on CEQA climate litigation” by delaying passage of the state budget. (Note: Ironically, this action resulted in the passage of Senate Bill 97, which led to the December 2009 CEQA Guideline amendments.) San Bernardino County officials also argued that the litigation was unnecessary and that requiring the County to implement mitigation measures prior to implementation of AB 32 was unreasonable.

Criticism has also been levied against Attorney General Settlements related to CEQA and climate change. In particular, settlement items required as part of the San Bernardino and ConocoPhillips cases dismayed some legal practitioners. Individuals have argued that the Attorney General and other suing parties have not taken a consistent approach in addressing global warming through the use of settlement agreements. For example, some allege that the San Bernardino settlement was primarily structural, requiring GHG inventories and mitigation, whereas the ConocoPhillips settlement relied heavily on carbon offsets, as opposed to onsite mitigation.

== Implications for CEQA practice ==
The court decisions discussed in this article provide guidance for practitioners undertaking climate change analyses for projects subject to CEQA. Appellate Courts have confirmed that GHG impacts are not too speculative to quantify and evaluate (see CBE v. City of Richmond). While the CEQA Guidelines do not specify a specific numeric threshold for significance, they provide lead agencies the discretion to select their own threshold.

The CEQA Guidelines identify categories of mitigation for GHG emissions. Decisions made by the Court of Appeals have clarified the statue with the following findings.

- Mitigation must be specific and cannot be deferred (see CBE v. City of Richmond).
- Lead agencies need not address every generic mitigation suggested by state and local agencies (see SCOPE v. City of Santa Clarita).

The Attorney General Settlements demonstrate the State's readiness to ensure lead agencies appropriately consider and mitigate GHG emissions and impacts to climate change. Settlements to date have often required additional mitigation, analysis, and/or the preparation of a CAP (see "Attorney General Settlements" above).

The Court of Appeals’ decision in Ballona v. City of Los Angeles potentially eliminates the need for lead agencies in the second district to consider impacts of climate change on proposed projects. On March 21, 2012, the Supreme Court denied case review and depublication requests submitted by several environmental organizations (National Resources Defense Council, Sierra Club, Center for Biological Diversity, and the Environmental Defense Center). Unless binding legislation that overturns the Ballona decision is adopted, courts throughout the State will be presented with the case as precedent. Nonetheless, courts outside the fourth district will have the discretion to differ in their interpretation of the CEQA Guidelines and may find that an analysis of climate change effects on proposed projects is required.
