= Kruger v R =

- Supreme Court of Canada

Hearing: October 19, 1976 Judgment: May 31, 1977
- Full case name: Jacob Kruger and Robert Manuel v Her Majesty The Queen
- Citations: [1978] 1 SCR 104, 1977 CanLII 3
- Prior history: Judgment for the Crown in the Court of Appeal for British Columbia

Holding
- The Wildlife Act applies to Indians under section 88 of the Indian Act.

Court membership
- Chief Justice: Bora Laskin; Puisne Justices: Ronald Martland, Wilfred Judson, Roland Ritchie, Wishart Spence, Louis-Philippe Pigeon, Brian Dickson, Jean Beetz, Louis-Philippe de Grandpré

Reasons given
- Unanimous reasons by: Dickson J.

Kruger v R, [1978] 1 S.C.R. 104, was a decision by the Supreme Court of Canada on the relationship between the Indian Act and provincial game laws. The Indian Act is a federal law enacted under the British North America Act, 1867, which gives jurisdiction over Aboriginals to the federal government. The Court found that the Indian Act's statement that provincial laws may apply to Aboriginal peoples in Canada as long as they apply to other people protects laws even if these laws affect Aboriginals more than others.

== Background ==
Jacob Kruger and Robert Manuel were Penticton First Nations people in British Columbia who killed deer outside hunting season. This was the land on which their tribe usually hunted, and it now belonged to the Crown. Since the hunting violated the provincial Wildlife Act, they were charged, but they appealed citing their Aboriginal rights under the Royal Proclamation, 1763.

The British Columbia Court of Appeal upheld the convictions, pointing to section 88 of the Indian Act. Section 88 stipulates that, "all laws of general application from time to time in force in any province are applicable to and in respect of Indians in the province, except to the extent that such laws are inconsistent with this Act or any order, rule, regulation or by-law made thereunder, and except to the extent that such laws make provision for any matter for which provision is made by or under this Act." The Court of Appeal found that this section allowed the Wildlife Act to apply to Aboriginals.

== Decision ==
Justice Brian Dickson, writing for a unanimous Court, decided against Kruger and Manuel. Dickson first found that if hunting rights have been denied, it is not necessarily true that compensation must be provided in turn. No property was confiscated, as the Wildlife Act was geared toward a different purpose. Dickson also said that he would not reconsider the landmark Aboriginal case Calder v. Attorney General of British Columbia (1973) to determine how Aboriginal title is properly extinguished.

Turning to the general questions in the case, Dickson cited The Queen v. George to state that section 88 of the Indian Act protected provincial laws with provincial purposes. In pith and substance, the law must apply to all people and not just a specific people for it to be a "general application" under section 88. It did not even matter if the law, while applying to all, had a more significant impact on Aboriginals than other people; Dickson said that "There are few laws which have a uniform impact." Dickson then noted that the Wildlife Act's purpose did not specifically address Aboriginals, and that it covered all people. As Dickson quoted another judge as saying, "no statute of the Provincial Legislature dealing with Indians or their lands as such would be valid and effective; but there is no reason why general legislation may not affect them."

Dickson also found that there was no evidence regarding an Aboriginal-related motive to the legislation. Thus, the Wildlife Act's purpose, Dickson concluded, was to preserve a natural resource, namely the wildlife, and was not meant to limit Aboriginal rights. Regarding whether hunting is an Aboriginal right, Dickson noted that "However abundant the right of Indians to hunt and to fish, there can be no doubt that such right is subject to regulation and curtailment by the appropriate legislative authority." This case could be distinguished from an Aboriginal victory in R. v. White and Bob (1965). In the Kruger case, there was no treaty that would trump the provincial law under section 88.

Finally, Dickson stated that if section 88 can incorporate the Wildlife Act (instead of the Wildlife Act being effective in its own right), the Aboriginals would have the burden of proof that the Wildlife Act was inconsistent with the Indian Act.

== Commentary ==
As Professor Peter Hogg writes, Indianness (primary Aboriginal issues under federal jurisdiction), should include hunting on a reserve. This was demonstrated in R. v. Jim (1915) and R. v. Isaac (1976). Outside a reserve, hunting as Indianness is more debatable; as this was what happened in the Kruger case, it appeared such hunting is not Indianness, but in Dick v. The Queen (1985), the Supreme Court assumed such hunting is Indianness.

== See also ==
- List of Supreme Court of Canada cases (Laskin Court)
- The Canadian Crown and First Nations, Inuit and Métis
- Canadian Aboriginal case law
- Numbered Treaties
- Section Thirty-five of the Constitution Act, 1982
- Indian Health Transfer Policy (Canada)
