= Chemical Waste Management, Inc. v. Hunt =

- Supreme Court of the United States

Argued April 21, 1992 Decided June 1, 1992
- Full case name: Chemical Waste Management, Inc., petitioner v. Guy Hunt, Governor of Alabama et al., respondents
- Citations: 504 U.S. 334 (more) 112 S. Ct. 2009; 119 L. Ed. 2d 121; 60 U.S.L.W. 4433; 34 ERC 1721; 22 Envtl. L. Rep. 20,909

Case history
- Prior: Hunt v. Chemical Waste Mgmt., Inc. 584 So.2d 1367 (Ala. 1991)

Holding
- No state may attempt to isolate itself from a problem common to the several States by raising barriers to the free flow of interstate trade; a fee on the importation of out-of-state waste constitutes a barrier to interstate trade. Supreme Court of Alabama reversed and case remanded with instructions.

Court membership
- Chief Justice William Rehnquist Associate Justices Byron White · Harry Blackmun; John P. Stevens · Sandra Day O'Connor; Antonin Scalia · Anthony Kennedy; David Souter · Clarence Thomas

Case opinions
- Majority: White, joined by Blackmun, Stevens, O'Connor, Scalia, Kennedy, Souter, Thomas
- Dissent: Rehnquist

Laws applied
- U.S. Const. Art. I § 8

Chemical Waste Management, Inc. v. Hunt, 504 U.S. 334 (1992), was a United States Supreme Court case that held that an Alabama law imposing a fee (of $72 per ton) on out-of-state hazardous waste being disposed of in-state violated the Dormant Commerce Clause.

== Opinion of the Court ==
The state law was found to discriminate against out-of-state commerce. Justice White explained that "No state may attempt to isolate itself from a problem common to the several States by raising barriers to the free flow of interstate trade," relying on Philadelphia v. New Jersey (1978) as precedent.

The Court suggested two less-discriminatory alternatives to the fee on out-of-state hazardous waste:

- A generally-applicable, additional fee per ton of all hazardous waste disposed of within Alabama, regardless of its source.
- A per-mile tax on all vehicles transporting hazardous waste across Alabama roads.

=== Dissent ===
Chief Justice Rehnquist dissented arguing that States may wish to avoid the risks to public health and environment by regulating the disposal of hazardous waste. He continued to say that since taxes are a recognized and effective means for discouraging the consumption of scarce commodities, which he in this case had deemed the environment. Then there was nothing unconstitutional or discriminatory about the state of Alabama's taxes.

== Related cases ==
- White v. Massachusetts Council of Constr. Employers, Inc., 460 U.S. 204, 206 -208 (1983)
- Reeves, Inc. v. Stake, 447 U.S. 429, 436-437 (1980)
- Hughes v. Alexandria Scrap Corp., 426 U.S. 794, 810 (1976)

== See also ==
- Emelle, Alabama
- Environmental dumping
- List of United States Supreme Court cases, volume 504
- List of United States Supreme Court cases
- Lists of United States Supreme Court cases by volume
- List of United States Supreme Court cases by the Rehnquist Court
