= Startups, shutdowns, and malfunctions =

Startups, shutdowns, and malfunctions (SSM) are periods of non-continuous operation in refineries, chemical plants or similar industrial facilities. During such temporary periods, these plants might emit larger amounts of pollution, and therefore the pollution abatement equipment may be unable to effectively control it.

Recognizing this problem, beginning in 1994 the American Environmental Protection Agency (EPA) allowed such facilities to release large amounts of otherwise prohibited air pollution during SSM. However, in 2002 and again in 2003 the EPA made regulatory revisions which seemed to increase the allowable periods of such non-compliance periods, which motivated a coalition of environmental groups to challenge the changes, by suing the EPA. These groups argued that these changes effectively neutralized the United States Clean Air Act.

The U.S. Court of Appeals for the District of Columbia issued a ruling on the lawsuit (19 December 2008), finding that allowing such SSM exemptions does violate requirements of the Clean Air Act, in that the CAA requires that some reasonable limit on a facility's emissions of hazardous air pollutants must always be in effect.

The American Chemistry Council, a trade association of industrial and chemical manufacturing companies, joined the EPA in the court's defense actions.

An EPA spokesman said in late December 2008 that the agency is studying the decision to determine an appropriate course of action.
