= Kvikk case =

The Kvikk case is about a variety of birth defects in the children of the men who served on HNoMS Kvikk, a Royal Norwegian Navy fast patrol boat (FPB) of the Snøgg class. An investigation found that the ship's electronic systems were not to blame; no other cause has been established. Suspicion arose when two former officers accidentally met in the orthopedic department at Haukeland University Hospital in Bergen, and it was later revealed that in all eleven children already had been born with birth defects from 1987 to 1994. In the end, the case counted 17 injured children, and it was also discovered that the phenomenon of birth defects already had started in 1983.

Among the claimed birth defects are clubfoot, thumb hypoplasia, hip dysplasia, congenital heart defects, structural brain damage, cataracts, and other defects. Some of the children have also had developmental delays and behavioral problems.

Kvikk was the only vessel in the Norwegian navy that was used as an electronic warfare (EW) vessel, and one widely discussed theory was that the powerful electromagnetic radiation from the boat's radio communication masts and radar led to several of those who served aboard the ship having children with clubfoot, and in some cases stillborn children. The idea was that the powerful radiation possibly damaged genetic material in the sperm of the men who worked aboard. A total of 17 out of 85 children of officers who served at Kvikk have been born with birth defects.

Of the other theories about the cause of the deformities is one that Kvikk was the only vessel that was used to experiment with different types of camouflage paint.

== 1987-94: Kvikk used for electronic warfare ==
In 1987 Kvikk was equipped for electronic warfare, partly by getting an extra radar sender stern rated to 750 watts, which then was used very actively to create radar jamming during exercises and tests. Kvikk went out of service as an EW-vessel in December 1994.

=== Risk for radiation injuries ===
The Norwegian Armed Forces knew before the case came up that very powerful radiation had been measured on Kvikk. There had also been measured heavy radiation at other defense vessels as well as land installations that all exceeded NATO's limits for radiation hazard, such as the HNoMS Narvik and HNoMS Tjeld. Kvikk, however, is a much smaller vessel than those, and the radiation distance to the crew was thus smaller. It was also not uncommon for the crew on Kvikk to reside around the mast during noise transmissions, and they were thus directly exposed to strong electromagnetic radiation from the mast that it has been speculated in whether may have affected their genetic material.

As an additional risk factor the radar on Kvikk had a stabilizer that were made to ensure that the radar beam was kept level with the horizon so that it also would work in choppy seas, but this mechanism had a weakness that made the radar tip over many times and thus sending radiation directly down on the deck. Therefore the crew in many cases have been directly exposed to radiation at a very close hold when they were on the deck.

In addition, four fathers who worked as electronic service technicians at the workshop of Haakonsvern got children with chromosome abnormalities. They worked, among other things, to correct errors and deficiencies in telecommunications equipment on Kvikk and other marine vessels, and were therefore under testing exposed to high levels of electromagnetic radiation, mostly from radars and communications equipment.

It is shown in research from the 60's and 70's that non-ionizing radiation in the microwave range can provide genotoxic mechanisms in germ cells in animals which are then relayed to the offspring, as well as practical examples have shown that radiation have led to infertility in humans, but little recent research supports this.

The Norwegian Navy, the Norwegian Radiation Protection Authority (NRPA) and a research group at Norwegian University of Science and Technology have concluded that there is no demonstrable link between the non-ionizing radiation on board and that the children were born with birth defects. The parents in the case have stated that they don't trust the research.

== 1996: The case comes forward ==
The case became known as the Haakonsvern Navy Base in 1996 issued a press release stating that an unusually high number of children of the employees at the naval base were damaged at birth. Verdens Gang (VG) was the first newspaper that took hold of the case, and the newspaper also found the relationship between the children who were born with birth defects and that their fathers had worked at Kvikk. VG immediately published a headline that read "[[Haakon VIII Crown Prince Haakon Magnus of Norway]] is one of the many who is currently aboard the MTB vessels and may be exposed to radiation."

The navy quickly made a decision to investigate whether there was a correlation between the electromagnetic radiation aboard Kvikk and the genes of those who had served there, but then Kvikk was already broken up - only nine days after the original press release from Haakonsvern.

== 1998: Initial research by the navy ==
After three officers in February 1996 had notified the navy inspectorate that they had got children with birth defects after serving on Kvikk, the navy the same year gave an internal message that they did not want to hear any more about such abnormalities from the naval staff.

The navy began to investigate whether the damages in this and similar cases could be due to radar and radio radiation. In 1998 they concluded that this was not the case and that there was no relationship between serving on the ship and having children with birth defects, so that there was no basis for liability. In the report, the Navy went far in rejecting any possible link whatsoever between birth defects to their children and that the fathers had served on Kvikk, and suggested statistical clustering as an explanation.

== See also ==
- HNoMS Kvikk (P984)
- Teratology
