= R v Jim =

R. v. Jim (1915)
- Court: British Columbia Supreme Court
- Decided: 1915
- Defendant: Edward Jim
- Citation: 26 C.C.C. 236

Case history
- Subsequent actions: The court found that Aboriginal hunting on Indian reserves is primarily a federal jurisdiction, relating to section 91(24) of the British North America Act, 1867, which assigns "Indians, and Lands reserved for the Indians" to the federal government. Edward Jim's conviction was overturned on the basis of federal jurisdiction.

Court membership
- Judge sitting: Justice Hunter

Case opinions
- Justice Hunter's interpretation of section 91(24) of the British North America Act and the broad application of the term "managed" in the context of Indian lands.

R. v. Jim (1915) 26 C.C.C. 236, was a decision by the British Columbia Supreme Court on Aboriginal ("Indian") hunting and provincial game laws. The court found that Aboriginal hunting on Indian reserves is primarily a federal jurisdiction, relating to section 91(24) of the British North America Act, 1867 which assigns "Indians, and Lands reserved for the Indians" to the federal government.

== Background ==
The case involved an Aboriginal chief named Edward Jim of the North Saanich tribe. In Victoria, British Columbia in 1914 a police magistrate convicted him of possession of a part of a deer in violation of the provincial Game Protection Act. Jim had hunted the deer on a reserve and used the meat in his home. He fought the charges against him by saying he had treaty rights, and that the British North America Act and federal Indian Act ensured the province could not apply this law to Aboriginals.

== Decision ==
Justice Hunter, on the BC Supreme Court, found that the conviction should be overturned. He pointed to section 91(24) of the British North America Act to note that "Indians" are under federal jurisdiction. The federal government had then enacted the Indian Act, and it stated that "Indian lands" are "managed" by the Governor in Council. Hunter interpreted the word "managed" to be broad in its application, and that it should include governing hunting and fishing on reserves (Indian lands). Hunter also noted that the federal government did regulate Aboriginal hunting in other provinces, suggesting it would have jurisdiction in British Columbia as well. The fact that there was no such regulation in British Columbia at the time possibly related to treaties.

== Aftermath ==
Generally, provincial laws apply to Aboriginals. Provincial laws do not apply when they affect "Indianness", primary Aboriginal issues. As a constitutional scholar Peter Hogg wrote, "Hunting on a reserve is such a significant element of traditional Indian ways that it should probably be free of provincial regulation." He pointed to R. v. Jim to back this up. As for hunting outside reserves, the Supreme Court of Canada case Kruger and al. v. The Queen (1978) suggested this was not "Indianness", whereas Dick v. The Queen (1985) suggested it was.

== See also ==
- List of notable Canadian lower court cases
- The Canadian Crown and First Nations, Inuit and Métis
- Canadian Aboriginal case law
- Numbered Treaties
- Section Thirty-five of the Constitution Act, 1982
- Indian Health Transfer Policy (Canada)
