= Solar Century Holdings Ltd v Secretary of State for Energy and Climate Change =

Solar Century Holdings Ltd v SS for Energy and Climate Change
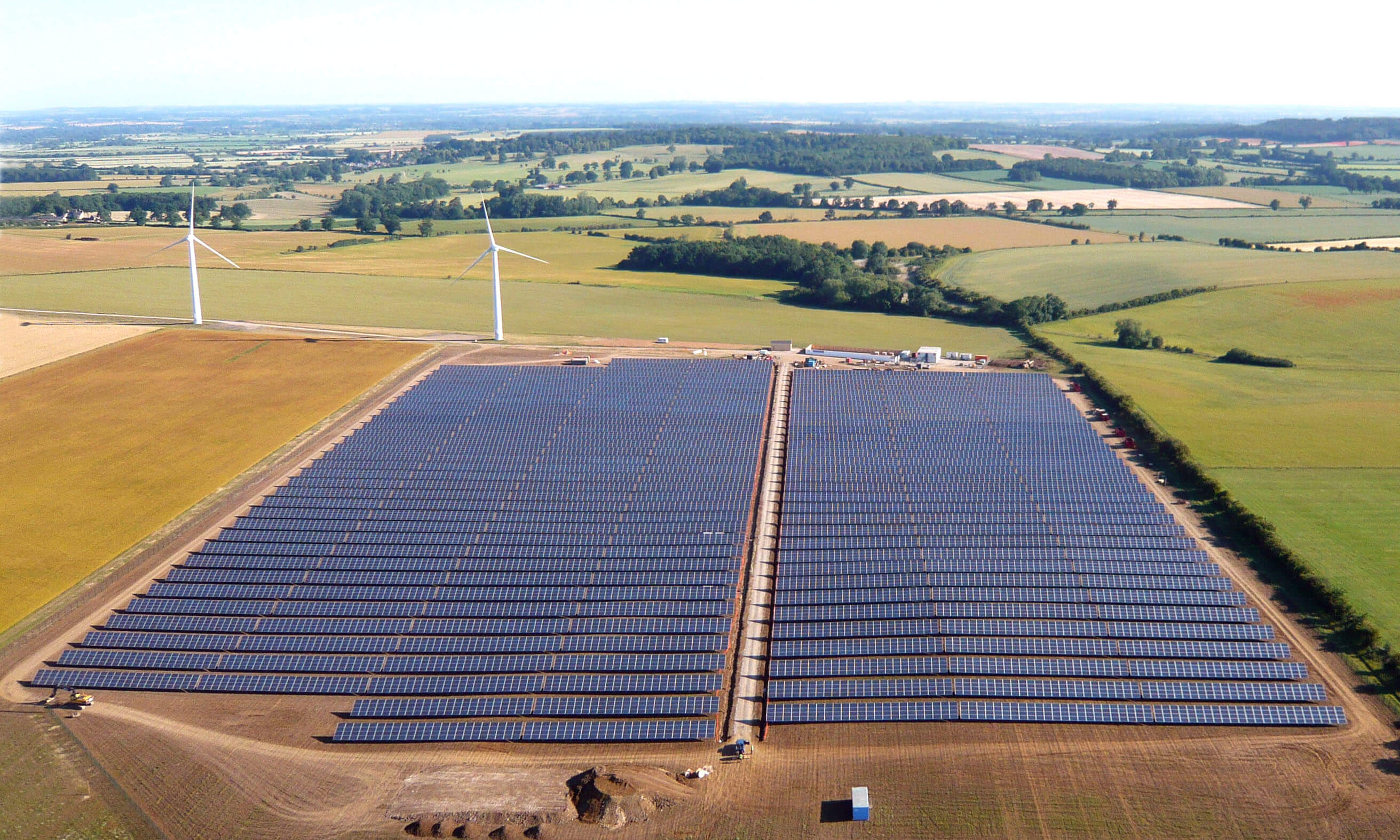
- Court: Court of Appeal
- Citation: [2016] EWCA Civ 117

Keywords
- Renewables obligation, energy

Solar Century Holdings Ltd v SS for Energy and Climate Change [2016] EWCA Civ 117 is a UK enterprise law case, on electricity generation by solar power. It held that the Secretary of State could stop scheme supporting renewable electricity, without breaching legitimate expectations, misusing power, or unfairness in a judicial review claim.

== Facts ==
Solar Century Ltd claimed the SS breached legitimate expectations, misused power, and acted unfairly by stopping the ‘renewables obligation’ for larger projects. Solar Century Ltd installed large solar photovoltaic systems (solar farms). It benefited from the renewables obligation scheme that started in 2002. In 2011, the renewables obligation was replaced with a ‘contracts for difference’ scheme. The government capped spending for energy and climate change. The Energy Act 2013, inserting Electricity Act 1989 ss 32LA-LB, gave the Secretary of State power to close the renewables obligation to new capacity. This was initially proposed for 31 March 2017 for solar PV capacity over 5MW. A government statement said it would be ‘maintaining support levels for ... existing investments’. The SS then decided to close it on 1 April 2015, with the Renewables Obligation Closure (Amendment) Order 2015, saying takeup was higher than expected and its cap would be exceeded. It had a grace period to protect people who could demonstrate a significant financial commitment to projects at the consultation date. Solar Century argued they had a legitimate expectation from clear representations by government that the scheme would be open until 2017, the 2015 Order was ultra vires the Electricity Act 1989 ss 32LA-LB, and it was unfair to specify a date in the past as one for identifying a significant financial commitment.

The government's decision, to be put into the Renewables Obligation Closure (Amendment) Order 2015, and the subject of the challenge was extracted by Floyd LJ:

33. The decision on the closure of the scheme was expressed in the October 2014 response to consultation in the following way:

"10. We have considered very carefully the arguments presented on both sides of this question. We acknowledge that bringing forward closure of the RO for large scale solar PV projects represents a change of policy from that previously announced and given effect in the RO Closure Order 2014, and that the majority of respondents are against us doing so. We have taken into account the fact that large-scale solar PV developers expected that the RO would remain open until 31 March 2017. However, we cannot ignore the very clear evidence that large-scale solar PV is deploying faster than can be afforded and, in addition, that there is significantly more potential deployment of large-scale solar PV than estimated when we published our consultation less than five months ago, and the heightened risk that this poses to the LCF. The position of large-scale solar PV developers who have made significant financial commitments in reliance on their expectation of the previously adopted closure date is addressed by our proposals for a grace period, as discussed on the question four below. 11. The Government has therefore decided to close the RO to new solar PV projects above 5 MW in scale from 1 April 2015, and to additional capacity added to existing accredited stations from that date, where the station is, or would become, above 5 MW."

== Judgment ==
Floyd LJ held that the government could change its policy where there were rational grounds, unless it amounted to abuse of power. No legitimate expectations were created that the date might not change. The Electricity Act 1989 section 32LA was wide enough to allow the SS to put forward the closure of the renewables obligation scheme. The grace period was not unfair, because if it were lawful to close the whole scheme in 2015 it was hard to see how giving some exceptions would be a bad thing.

Solar farm investment

39. To put matters in perspective, I should say something about the quantum and timescale of solar farm investment. The evidence of Mr Faulks, the company secretary of the first claimant, was that a typical development schedule for a 5 MW plus solar farm, up to the commencement of construction, spanned some 10 months. The planning application would be made in months 5 to 7. Up to the stage of the planning application some £50,000 would be spent per site. Mr Selwyn on behalf of the second claimant indicated a 41-week schedule up to the commencement of construction, with planning and legal fees spent in weeks 1 to 22 estimated at £200,000 or 2% of overall cost.

The grounds of attack on the decision 40. There are four grounds on which the decision was and is challenged:

i) the decision to implement an early closure of the RO scheme by statutory instrument was ultra vires the powers granted by sections 32 LA and LB of the Electricity Act 1989 because the statutory power was for the purpose of preserving the 2017 closure date and not for extending it, ("issue 1");

ii) the pre-legislative statements that the RO scheme will run until 2017 amounted to the type of assurance which would bind the executive and early closure violated those assurances, ("issue 2");

iii) the statements made by the Government from 2010 onwards that the scheme would not close before 2017 were clear and unequivocal representations giving rise to a legitimate expectation which was not thwarted by any policy consideration, ("issue 3");

iv) the periods of grace are retrospective in effect and therefore unfair in a public law sense, ("issue 4").

[...]

Issue 3: legitimate expectations 49. There was no real dispute about the relevant principles which apply to the role of legitimate expectations in a situation in which the state wishes to change a previously announced policy. The principles were elucidated by Laws LJ in Bhatt Murphy v Independent Assessor [2008] EWCA Civ 755 and it is not necessary to repeat them here. Mr Fordham drew our attention to paragraph 34 in that judgment, where Laws LJ said that a promise that a policy would continue "if it points to no particular date or future event to mark the end of the policy" amounted to little more than the ordinary expectation that a policy would continue in force until rational grounds existed for its cessation. Then, at [43] Laws LJ put it in this way:

"43. Authority shows that where a substantive expectation is to run the promise or practice which is its genesis is not merely a reflection of the ordinary fact (as I have put it) that a policy with no terminal date or terminating event will continue in effect until rational grounds for its cessation arise. Rather it must constitute a specific undertaking, directed at a particular individual or group, by which the relevant policy's continuance is assured. Lord Templeman in Preston referred (866 – 867) to "conduct [in that case, of the Commissioners of Inland Revenue] equivalent to a breach of contract or breach of representations"".

50. It is true that this passage is prefaced by reference to a policy with no terminal date or terminating event. Even where an end date is given, however, there can be no immutable presumption on that ground alone that the policy will continue without change until that date, whatever changes in circumstances may arise. That is because Government is entitled to formulate and re-formulate policy when rational grounds exist for doing so, unless to do so would amount to an abuse of power by reason of the manner in which it has previously conducted itself: see per Laws LJ at [41] to [42]. In each case the ultimate question is whether there is a "specific undertaking, directed at a particular individual or group, by which the relevant policy's continuance is assured".

[...]

52. It thus becomes critical to understand what was promised by the Government and, in particular, what was meant by paragraph 1.3 of the LCF (see paragraph 9 above) when the Government spoke of "maintaining support levels for those existing investments where it has said it would do so". Does that phrase include investments which are in the pipeline towards accreditation but not yet accredited?

[...]

55. There is also the context of the LCF itself. The LCF makes it quite plain that policies within the framework will be subject to rigorous adjustment where spending threatens to exceed the agreed cap. There is an express warning that higher than expected deployment of renewable energy installations will not cause the agreed cap to be increased, as well as the express reservation of the right to make changes to policies within the framework. This is an unpromising background for a suggestion that the phrase "maintaining support levels for existing investments" was intended to extend to pipeline investments which might be proceeding at higher than expected rates.

56. The White Paper in July 2011 also contains no suggestion that there was any proposal to protect pipeline investments as opposed to accredited installations. Paragraph 8.4 of the White Paper speaks of protecting "existing investments under the RO" (by grandfathering) and draws a distinction with projects which are merely under development (where a choice will exist between the RO and the CfD). Pipeline investments are not investments "under the RO".

57. The LCF Q&A document also makes clear the fact that policy in this area was subject to change if there was higher than expected deployment.

58. Whilst Mr Fordham is correct to say that the SoS had been at pains to reassure the industry that it wanted to provide a stable investment environment, this was not the sole objective of policy in this area....

Issues 1 and 2: misuse of statutory power and clear assurances 61. Section 32LA of the Electricity Act 1989 provides as follows:

"32LA Renewables obligation closure order

(1) The Secretary of State may make a renewables obligation closure order.

(2) A renewables obligation closure order is an order which provides that no renewables obligation certificates are to be issued under a renewables obligation order in respect of electricity generated after a specified date.

(3) Provision made under subsection (2) may specify different dates in relation to different cases or circumstances.

(4) The cases or circumstances mentioned in subsection (2) may in particular be described by reference to—

(a) accreditation of a generating station, or

(b) the addition of generating capacity to a generating station."

62. It is common ground that the language used in section 32LA is, on its face, wide enough to enable the SoS to curtail the period of operation of the RO Scheme from 2017 to 2015. Mr Fordham submits (in his skeleton argument) that the judge's conclusion that the purpose of the statutory power was to address the two technical matters identified, namely the ability to close RO schemes in their entirety, and for Scotland as well as England and Wales, was an error, because it ignored a third purpose, which was to close it with effect from 1 April 2017. He further submits that if the purpose of the power was to close the RO scheme in its entirety, then the challenge is still a good one because the SoS has purported to exercise the power for the purpose of closing the scheme only in relation to solar PV capacity above 5 MW.

63. I am unable to accept these submissions. As to the first point, I cannot see any reason why Parliament should have intended that the Minister's power should be constrained to closing the scheme as from 1st April 2017. Parliament gave the Minister a power to close the scheme "to electricity generated after a specified date". Neither the Ministerial statement nor the Explanatory Notes suggest that the purpose of conferring this power was to allow it to be exercised only in relation to a date on or after 1 April 2017. The Minister stated that the closure was planned for 31 March 2017. That was a statement of Government policy: he did not say that that there would be no circumstances in which the RO scheme would be closed any earlier. The Explanatory Notes record, correctly, that the White Paper proposed that the transitional phase to CfDs would end on 31 March 2017, and also correctly described the effect of the power contained in section 32LA. There is nothing in the Notes to indicate that the purpose of the power was to keep the scheme open until 2017. Indeed, as the judge observed, no new power was needed to keep the existing scheme open.

64. None of the material in the case provides a basis for suggesting that the power was only given for the purpose of closing the RO scheme on or after 31 March 2017.

65. As to the second point, it does not follow from the fact that the purpose of the power was to enable the SoS to close the RO scheme in its entirety and for the whole territory that the SoS could not exercise the power for some lesser purpose. Indeed the SoS is expressly empowered to specify different dates in relation to different cases or circumstances. He chose to specify a date in the case of large solar PV, as he was empowered to do.

66. Whilst presented to the judge as an independent point, I do not consider that the appellants' case based on clear assurances (issue 2) can survive the conclusions I have come to on the legitimate expectations case. Reading it in its proper context, I am unable to regard any of the material in this case as providing anything in the nature of a clear and binding assurance, to Parliament or otherwise, that the scheme would not be closed before 2017.

Issue 4: unfair grace periods 67. The main focus of Mr Fordham's submission on this final ground of challenge was the unfairness of specifying a date which has already passed as the date by which an investor in solar PV would have to have satisfied the various criteria for a significant investment, and thereby benefit from the grace period. He submitted that this was conspicuously unfair in a public law sense.

[...]

74. If the SoS was going to have a grace period at all, then I do not regard it as remotely arguable that he was obliged to extend it to anyone who had made more than de minimis investment as the appellants contend. There is no conceivable reason why the grace periods should have such a long tail. In those circumstances a line had to be drawn. There can be no criticism of the procedural fairness of the process of consultation adopted to determine where the line should be drawn: it in fact resulted in a significant relaxation of the conditions. In setting the conditions the SoS had to balance a number of considerations, as the judge held, including the important one of not accelerating pipeline investment so as to exacerbate the very problem which had caused the date to be brought forward. These were all matters for the decision making of the SoS. There is no basis for interference by way of judicial review.

75. I reject the appellants' suggestions that the grace periods were the subject of retrospective legislation, and that the use of the legislation to enact them was unfair in a public law sense. Accordingly I would reject this ground of challenge as well.

Tomlinson LJ and Treacy LJ agreed.

== See also ==
- United Kingdom enterprise law
- Solar power in the United Kingdom
