= United States v. Reserve Mining Company =

American environmental court case

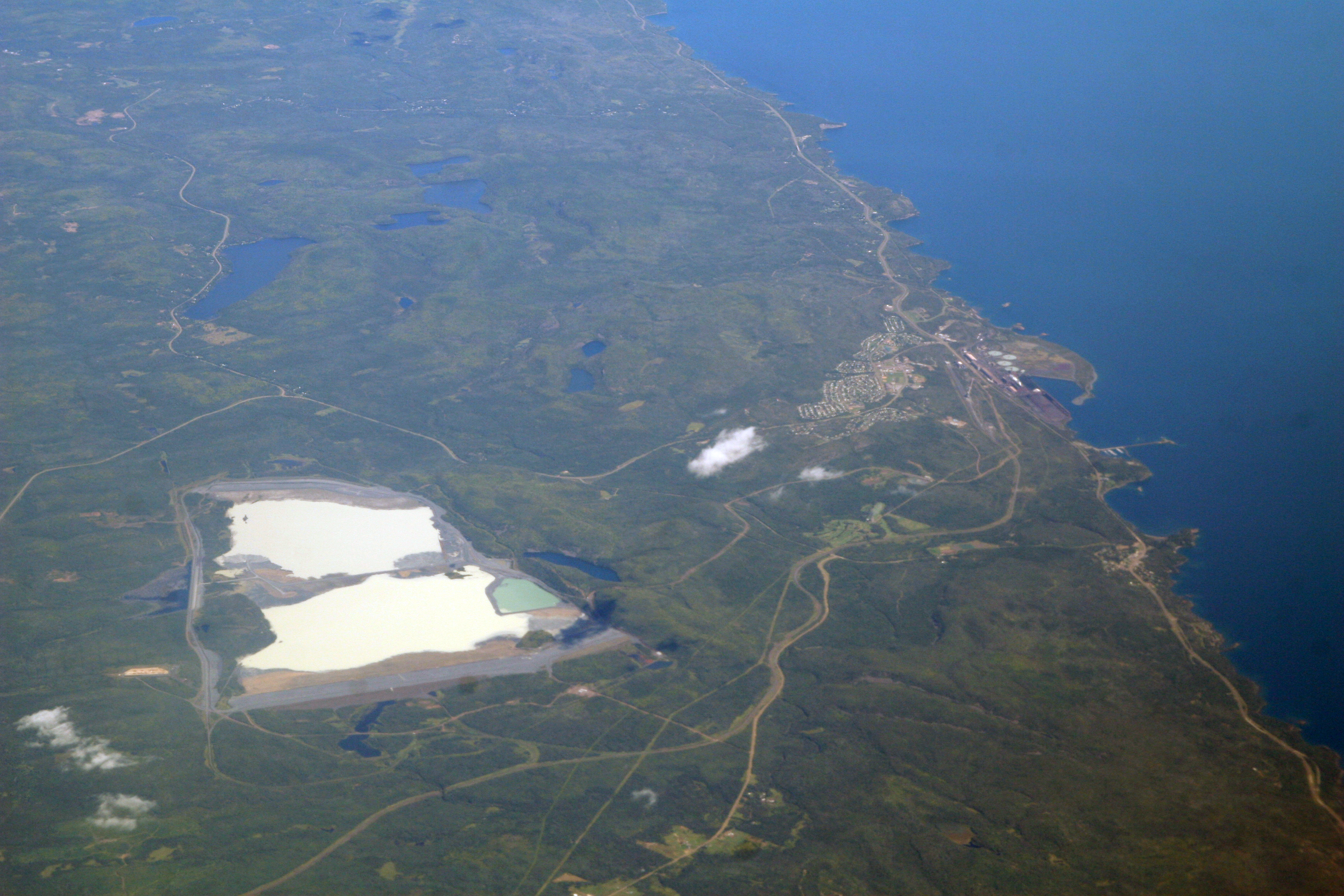
Silver Bay's taconite ponds, 2010.

United States of America v. Reserve Mining Company, 408 F. Supp. 1212 (D. Minn. 1976), was a United States District Court for the District of Minnesota case that determined the Reserve Mining Company was responsible for amphibole asbestos fibers found in the public drinking water of Duluth, Minnesota and other North Shore (Minnesota) communities.

After the discovery of taconite in the late nineteenth century, scientists struggled to find ways to extract iron ore from this sedimentary rock, which contains 25 to 30 percent iron. The process that was eventually developed involves crushing the hard rock into a powder-like consistency. The iron ore is then removed with magnets and turned into pellets.

By 1955, the Reserve Mining Company complex was built to extract iron from taconite. A new town, Silver Bay, was constructed to support it. For every ton of iron ore produced, however, two tons of waste material was leftover. The Reserve Mining Company dumped the waste material, called tailings, into Lake Superior. Permits to do this were approved by the state.

The waste material was initially considered no more harmful than sand. But by the late 1960s, local environmental groups, commercial fishermen, and sport-fishing groups began to complain about the taconite sediment. They argued that the tailings were killing fish, permanently clouding the pristine waters, and spoiling Lake Superior as a freshwater source for Duluth and the surrounding communities.

Environmental organizations, scientists, and lawyers made the case that the tailings not only polluted Lake Superior but that they contained cummingtonite-grunerite. This substance is found in asbestos, a known carcinogen.

On February 17, 1972, on behalf of the Environmental Protection Agency (EPA), the Department of Justice filed a lawsuit against the Reserve Mining Company in U. S. District Court in Minneapolis. This led to a trial that would last over a year. Appeals dragged the case on until 1980. Judge Miles Lord presided over the court.

Pretrial arguments took a turn in June 1973. The federal government called a specialist in asbestos exposure, Dr. Irving Selikoff, from the Mount Sinai School of Medicine in New York. Dr. Selikoff argued that the lake contained asbestos-like fibers. He also said he thought a thorough study should be done on the effects of the lake water on the human body. Judge Lord put Dr. Selikoff's testimony under an order of secrecy, but the information wasn't contained. Eventually, Lord allowed the EPA to issue an asbestos warning to the public.

The asbestos issue defined the trial when it officially began in August 1973. The public, already alarmed by reports of asbestos deaths around the country, was fixated on the trial. It was also covered in the national press.

The Reserve Mining Company claimed that it was impossible to dump the tailings on land. During the trial, however, subpoenaed documents showed that Reserve had already examined dumping the sediment on land as an alternative method of disposal.

Both the federal government and Reserve relied on a prestigious lineup of scientists to buttress their case. After months of testimony, Judge Lord decided that dumping the tailings into Lake Superior posed serious health and environmental threats. In April 1974 he ordered the plant shut down.

The plant was closed temporarily. But a federal appeals court allowed Reserve to reopen the mine and to continue dumping in the lake until the company could find a new disposal method. In 1980, Reserve began to deposit waste in an inland pond. This practice continues with the companies that mine taconite today.

The ruling in United States of America v. Reserve Mining Company was considered a landmark decision. It gave the EPA broader powers to regulate corporate pollution, a practice was unheard of before the lawsuit.

== Notes ==
- This article incorporates text from a free content work. Licensed under CC BY-SA 3.0 (license statement/permission). Text taken from United States of America v. Reserve Mining Company, Minnesota Historical Society. MNopedia.

== Bibliography ==
- Associated Press. "Judge Will Close Lake to Reserve's Discharges." Minneapolis Star, February 27, 1974.
- Bastow, Thomas R. This Vast Pollution: United States of America v. Reserve Mining Company. Washington, D.C.: Green Fields Books, 1986.
- Davis, E.W. Pioneering with Taconite. St. Paul: Minnesota Historical Society, 1964.
- Hodierne, Robert. "EPA asks Justice Department to Sue Reserve Mining for Tailings Disposal." Minneapolis Star, January 20, 1972.
- Wright, Frank. "Suit Filed Against Reserve." Minneapolis Tribune, February 1, 1972.
