= Grazing rights in Nevada =

Grazing on public land in Nevada, US

Grazing rights in Nevada covers a number of rangeland Federal and state laws and regulations applicable to the state of Nevada. Rangelands are distinguished from pasture lands because they grow primarily native vegetation, rather than plants established by humans. Ranchers may lease or obtain permits to use portions of this public rangeland and pay a fee based on the number and type of livestock and the period for which they are on the land.

== History ==
The United States purchased land from Mexico in 1848 known as the Mexican Cession (the southwestern region of the U.S.) as part of the Treaty of Guadalupe Hidalgo. The Nevada Territory, which was partitioned in 1861 from the Utah Territory, became a state in 1864. Since then, the US government has continuously owned land in Nevada, including the Bunkerville Allotment. Federal rangelands in Nevada have been since 1934 managed principally by either the Bureau of Land Management, its predecessor the United States Grazing Service, or the United States Forest Service. Currently, 56,961,778 acres of land in Nevada are managed by the BLM. Over 18,000 grazing permits and leases are known to exist on BLM managed public lands. Season of use and forage use are stipulated on the permits and leases; grazing control can be targeted.

== Federal rangeland laws ==
Map of all federally owned land in the United States. The area in yellow represents land managed by the Bureau of Land Management

Laws that apply to management of public land grazing are generally codified in Title 43 of the United States Code and include the Taylor Grazing Act of 1934 (TGA), the National Environmental Policy Act of 1969, the Endangered Species Act of 1973, the Federal Land Policy and Management Act of 1976, the Public Rangelands Improvement Act of 1978, and the Wild and Free-Roaming Horses and Burros Act of 1971.

In 1933, Edward T. Taylor, a Representative from Colorado, reintroduced a bill to set up the grazing bureau or service in the Department of Interior to administer range lands. The TGA (Note: 43 U.S. Code §§ 315-316o (P.L. 73-482)) regulates grazing on public lands (excluding in Alaska) to improve rangeland conditions. The Grazing Service was merged with the United States General Land Office in 1946 to form the Bureau of Land Management (BLM).

Prior to the enactment of the TGA, an open-range system existed on public domain land. The TGA was enacted by Congress to prevent overgrazing of rangelands, and authorized the permitted use of lands designated as available for livestock grazing while specifying that grazing permits convey no right, title, or interest to such lands. This definition was unanimously upheld by the United States Supreme Court in 2000. The TGA allows the BLM to increase or decrease the utilization of a grazing area in response to changing ecological conditions, and specifies that permits are subject to periodic review at least every 10 years, with holders having preferential rights to renew "in the discretion of the Secretary of the Interior."

== Nevada rangeland laws ==
An article written by University of Nevada Cooperative Extension Educators Gary McCuin and Steve Foster, highlights the Nevada Open Range Law of 1893, a state statute under which "owners of ... livestock running at large on the ranges or commons” were exempted from state civil liability for trespass, and the open range was defined as “all unenclosed land outside of cities and towns upon which cattle, sheep or other domestic animals by custom, license, lease or permit are grazed”. However, the federal Taylor Grazing Act has further regulated grazing on federal land since 1934, and violators may be subject to federal civil and criminal liability.

== Federal rangeland grazing regulations ==
The Bureau of Land Management manages about 167 million acres (676,000 km^{2}) of publicly owned rangeland in the United States, with the United States Forest Service managing approximately 95 million acres (380,000 km^{2}) more. Permittees on federal rangelands are required to pay a fee, and the permit cannot exceed ten years but is renewable.

Any US citizen or validly licensed business can apply for a BLM grazing permit or lease. To do so, one must either buy or control private property (known as "base property") that has been legally recognized by the Bureau as having preference for the use of public land grazing privileges, or acquire property that has the capability to serve as base property and then apply to the BLM to transfer the preference for grazing privileges from an existing base property to the acquired property (which would become the new "base property").

=== Federal rangeland regulatory changes in 1993 ===
The grazing rules for the land went through changes over the years, including some updated grazing rules in 1993 in the Gold Butte and Bunkerville land area of Nevada. Among other issues, the 1993 rules were changed to protect the vulnerable desert tortoise. Other rules included limits to the number of cattle allowed in certain areas to protect the lands from the severe overgrazing caused by less regulation in previous years and to help the land recover from recent wildfires. Currently there are no grazing permits on the Bunkerville allotment, and any livestock on that land are there illegally.

== Bundy standoff ==
The Bundy standoff is a 20-year legal dispute between the United States Bureau of Land Management (BLM) and cattle rancher Cliven Bundy in southeastern Nevada over unpaid grazing fees that eventually developed into an armed confrontation between protesters and law enforcement. The dispute began in 1993, when in protest against changes to grazing rules, Bundy declined to renew his permit for cattle grazing on BLM-administered lands near Bunkerville, Nevada. In 1998, Bundy was prohibited from grazing his cattle on the Bunkerville Allotment by the United States District Court for the District of Nevada in United States v. Bundy. In July 2013, the BLM complaint was supplemented when federal judge Lloyd D. George ordered that Bundy refrain from trespass on federally administered land in the Gold Butte, Nevada, area in Clark County.

On March 27, 2014, 145,604 acres of federal land in Clark County, Nevada were temporarily closed for the "capture, impound, and removal of trespass cattle". A trespass cattle roundup commenced on April 5, an arrest was made on April 6. On April 12, a group of protesters, some of whom were armed advanced on what the BLM described as a "cattle gather." Sheriff Doug Gillespie negotiated with Cliven Bundy and newly confirmed BLM director, Neil Kornze, who elected to release the cattle and de-escalate the situation.

== Federal grazing legal cases ==
=== United States v. Gardner ===
Cliff Gardner, a defendant in an illegal cattle grazing court case in Nevada, United States v. Gardner, drew comparisons to his case when he said, "I think Cliven is taking a stand not only for family ranchers, but also for every freedom-loving American, for everyone. I’ve been trying to resolve these same types of issues since 1984." Gardner argued and lost on states' rights, similar to Bundy, and eventually served time for ignoring court orders and contempt. The Gardner case is cited in Bundy court filings. In United States v. Gardner, decided in the District Court and later affirmed by the United States Court of Appeals, Ninth Circuit, the Gardners did not contest that they grazed livestock without a permit, nor the amount of the fee assessed. Instead, they asserted that the Nevadan lands where they grazed did not belong to the United States, and therefore the Forest Service did not have jurisdiction to regulate use of the lands or levy fees for unauthorized activities within them. In March 2002, Cliff Gardner was sentenced to a month in a Reno halfway house, along with a $5,000 fine and a year of probation.

=== United States v. Bundy ===
The case of United States v. Bundy played out over many years in the United States District Court for the District of Nevada. It involved court orders, injunctions, and notices. Bundy argued pro se that the land belongs to the state, while the Bureau of Land Management was represented by the US Attorney's Office for Nevada and the United States Department of Justice. The court ruled that the land on which Bundy was grazing his cattle was indeed owned by the federal government, that he had not been paying to use it as he should have been, that Bundy and his cattle were trespassing, and that the government had the right to enforce the injunctions against trespass. The court found that Bundy repeatedly violated the court orders and continued to have his cattle trespass.

=== United States v. Hage ===
Elko County commissioner, Nevada rancher, and conservative Republican political activist Demar Dahl "notes that Bundy might benefit from following Nye County rancher Wayne Hage, who won a protracted battle with the federal government by successfully arguing that he had the right to graze his cows within two miles of water sources he developed." In a similar case to Bundy's, ranchers in 2007 were sued by the Justice Department for trespassing on public domain lands in Nevada. The ranchers were alleged to have repeatedly grazed livestock without federal permits, despite repeated trespass notices from the BLM and the Department of Agriculture's Forest Service. In 2013, the court found in favor of the ranchers for all other charges, including water rights, grazing rights, and all but two livestock trespass charges in United States v. Wayne Hage. In the ruling, the judge said, "government officials ... entered into a literal, intentional conspiracy to deprive the Hages not only of their permits but also of their vested water rights. This behavior shocks the conscience of the Court and provides a sufficient basis for a finding of irreparable harm to support the injunction described at the end of this Order."

== See also ==
- Grazing rights
- Conservation grazing
- List of United States federal environmental statutes
