= Missouri, Kansas, & Texas Railway Co. of Texas v. May =

Missouri, K. & T.R. Co. of Texas v. May
- Supreme Court of the United States

Argued March 17, 1903 Decided May 2, 1904
- Full case name: Missouri, Kansas, & Texas Railway Company of Texas v. Clay May
- Citations: 194 U.S. 267 (more) 24 S. Ct. 638; 48 L. Ed. 971; 1904 U.S. LEXIS 853

Holding
- A Texas law did not violate the 14th Amendment by penalizing only railroads for allowing certain weeds to go to seed.

Court membership
- Chief Justice Melville Fuller Associate Justices John M. Harlan · David J. Brewer; Henry B. Brown · Edward D. White; Rufus W. Peckham · Joseph McKenna; Oliver W. Holmes Jr. · William R. Day

Case opinions
- Majority: Holmes, joined by Fuller, Harlan, Peckham, Day
- Concurrence: Brewer
- Dissent: Brown
- Dissent: White
- Dissent: McKenna

Missouri, Kansas, [sic] & Texas Railway Company of Texas v. Clay May, 194 U.S. 267 (1904), was a decision by the United States Supreme Court which held that a Texas law did not violate the Fourteenth Amendment to the United States Constitution by penalizing only railroad companies for allowing certain weeds to mature and go to seed on their land.

== Overview ==
Clay May, a Texas farmer who was not represented by counsel, obtained a penalty payment of US$25 from the Missouri, Kansas and Texas Railway of Texas (the Missouri, Kansas and Texas Railway's Texas subsidiary), also known as the "MKT", for having allowed Johnson grass to grow on its land. Under a 1901 Texas law, any railroad allowing Johnson grass or Russian thistle to mature and go to seed on their land would have to pay this penalty to owners of adjacent land, as long as those owners had not done the same thing. The MKT appealed and lost, and then appealed to the U.S. Supreme Court, arguing that the law violated the equal-treatment provisions of the Fourteenth Amendment, as it penalized only railroad companies and not other individuals or companies that allowed these weeds to grow.

== Decision ==
Justice Holmes, less than two years into his service on the Supreme Court, wrote for the Court's majority that a state law "should not be disturbed by the courts under the 14th Amendment, unless they can see clearly that there is no fair reason for the law that would not require ... its extension to others whom it leaves untouched." He wrote the Court felt "unable to say" whether the law was too arbitrary; that "it would have been more obviously fair" to also penalize highways; but offered several possible explanations for the Texas legislature's singling out of the railroads, and wrote that "legislatures are ultimate guardians of the liberties and welfare of the people in quite as great a degree as the courts." This latter line has been quoted numerous times in subsequent U.S. Supreme Court opinions, when the author of an opinion or dissent has deferred to a legislature. Although brief, Holmes's opinion has been said to have "displayed in miniature ... most of the features of his mature constitutional thought."

== Dissent ==
Justice Brown dissented, writing that the Texas law did not treat railroads differently because of the nature of a railroad, but pursued the railroad "merely as the proprietor of certain land alongside its track", which was excessively arbitrary under the Fourteenth Amendment, as other landowners were not penalized for the same offense.

== See also ==
- Maine v. Taylor: 1986 case on invasive species
- List of United States Supreme Court cases, volume 194
