= City of Philadelphia v. New Jersey =

- Supreme Court of the United States

Argued March 27, 1978 Decided June 23, 1978
- Full case name: City of Philadelphia v. New Jersey
- Citations: 437 U.S. 617 (more) 98 S. Ct. 2531; 57 L. Ed. 2d 475

Case history
- Prior: City of Philadelphia v. State, 376 A.2d 888 (N.J. 1977); probable jurisdiction noted, 434 U.S. 964 (1977).

Holding
- A state may not prohibit or place barriers to articles of commerce entering or exiting its boundaries without express Congressional authorization or a compelling state interest; solid and liquid refuse and the rights to landfill space to dispose thereof are articles of commerce under the Commerce Clause. Supreme Court of New Jersey reversed.

Court membership
- Chief Justice Warren E. Burger Associate Justices William J. Brennan Jr. · Potter Stewart; Byron White · Thurgood Marshall; Harry Blackmun · Lewis F. Powell Jr. William Rehnquist · John P. Stevens

Case opinions
- Majority: Stewart, joined by Brennan, White, Marshall, Blackmun, Powell, Stevens
- Dissent: Rehnquist, joined by Burger

Laws applied
- U.S. Const. art. I § 8 cl. 3 (Commerce Clause), Dormant Commerce Clause, N.J. Waste Control Act, N.J. Stat. Ann. § 13 et seq

City of Philadelphia v. New Jersey, 437 U.S. 617 (1978), was a case in which the Supreme Court of the United States held that states could not discriminate against another state's articles of commerce.

== Background ==
On account of its location wedged between New York City and Philadelphia (the two largest cities on the East Coast of the United States), New Jersey has long been a heavily industrialized state, frequently containing factories and other facilities for businesses centered in or servicing the major cities nearby; as well as in the state. Among the facilities developed in New Jersey was waste processing, including both toxic waste and regular municipal-waste landfills. Municipalities and businesses outside New Jersey made such extensive use of the state's waste-processing facilities that in 1973, the New Jersey Legislature passed a Waste Control Act (N.J.S.A. § 13 et seq.) prohibiting the importation of most "solid or liquid waste which originated or was collected outside the territorial limits of the State."

Subsequent to the passage of the Act, the City of Philadelphia, whose municipal waste was delivered in part to landfills and other waste-processing facilities in New Jersey, filed suit against the New Jersey Department of Environmental Protection in the Chancery Division of the New Jersey Superior Court, seeking an injunction against enforcement of the Waste Control Act on the grounds that it was unconstitutional. The New Jersey Supreme Court, however, found that the law advanced vital health and environmental objectives with no economic discrimination against, and with little burden upon, interstate commerce. It therefore found it permissible under the Commerce Clause of the Constitution. The plaintiffs appealed to the Supreme Court of the United States.

== Opinion of the Court ==
On appeal, the U.S. Supreme Court found the New Jersey Waste Control Act unconstitutional because it violated the Dormant Commerce Clause and reversed the New Jersey Supreme Court's decision. In writing for the majority, Justice Stewart concluded that

whatever New Jersey's ultimate purpose, it may not be accomplished by discriminating against articles of commerce coming from outside the State unless there is some reason, apart from their origin, to treat them differently.

Furthermore, the court held that legitimate local interests which had incidental interstate effects were within the state's general police powers, but "where simple economic protectionism is effected by state legislation, a virtually per se rule of invalidity has been erected".

=== Dissent ===
Justice Rehnquist, joined by Justice Burger, maintained that the law was constitutional, on the basis of the validity of quarantine laws. Rehnquist reasoned that the toxic trash New Jersey handled from out-of-state was no different from diseased meat and germ-infected rags that were legally prohibited in quarantine laws.

The physical fact of life that New Jersey must somehow dispose of its own noxious items does not mean that it must serve as a depository for those of every other state.

Because states can rightfully burden interstate commerce in the name of health and safety, Rehnquist found no hindrance to this law in the Commerce Clause.

== See also ==
- Chemical Waste Management, Inc. v. Hunt
- Environmental dumping
