= HNoMS Kvikk (P984) =

Norwegian patrol boat allegedly associated with birth defects

History
- Name: Kvikk
- Builder: Navy Yard, Karljohansvern
- Laid down: 1970
- Decommissioned: 1994
- Fate: Scrapped, 1996; Reconstructed, 1997

General characteristics
- Class & type: Snøgg-class patrol boat
- Displacement: 138 long tons (140 t)
- Length: 36.5 m (119 ft 9 in)
- Beam: 6 m (19 ft 8 in)
- Propulsion: 2 × Maybach diesel engines, 7,200 hp (5,369 kW) total
- Speed: 30 knots (35 mph; 56 km/h)
- Complement: 19
- Armament: 4 × Penguin anti-ship missiles; 4 × Wire-guided torpedoes; 1 × 40 mm (1.6 in) AA gun

HNoMS Kvikk (P984) was a Royal Norwegian Navy fast patrol boat (FPB) of the Snøgg class which was built in 1970, taken out of service in 1994 and scrapped in 1996. The boat gained a lot of media attention in the so called Kvikk case, due to claims that an abnormally high number of the children of the men who had served on the boat were born with club foot or other congenital disorders.

== EW vessel ==
In 1987, the Kvikk was equipped as an electronic warfare (EW) vessel. Among other equipment, she received an extra RF transmitter aft rated at 750 watts and a powerful radar, which was actively used in exercises and tests. Her service as an EW vessel ended in December 1994.

== Reconstruction ==
In 1996, Kvikk was scrapped. Therefore, it was decided in 1997 to rebuild a sister ship with the same electronic equipment in order to find out if there was a link between health problems and the use of the equipment. The tests carried out by the RNoN in collaboration with scientists from the Norwegian University of Science and Technology (NTNU) were inconclusive, and no direct link was found. However, the investigation of the case was set to continue until 2006, and the RNoN is working on new guidelines for radiation aboard their vessels.
