= Cancer Alley =

Area in Louisiana with larger than usual clusters of cancer patients

Coordinates: 30.0°N 90.6°W

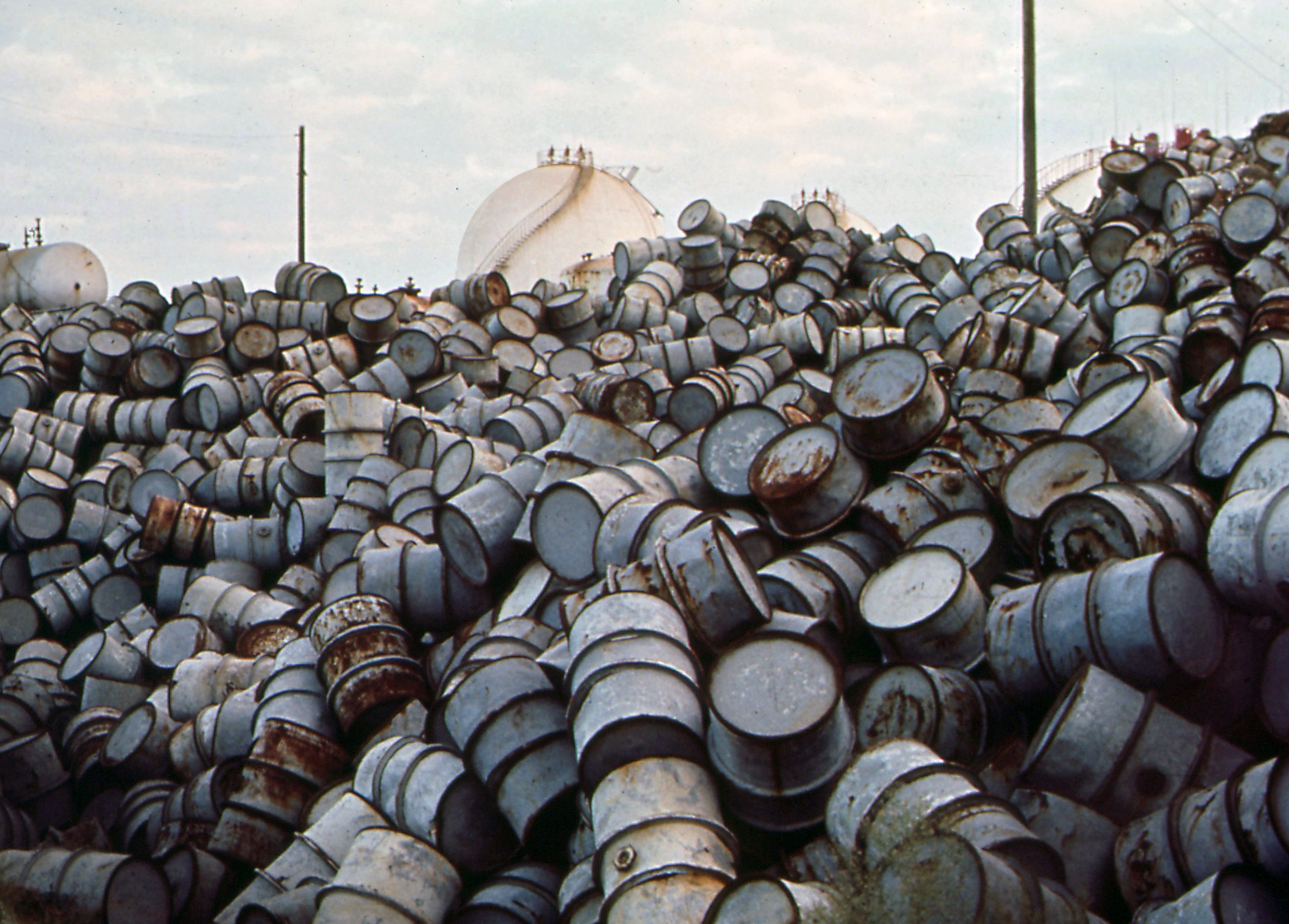
A mound of oil drums near the Baton Rouge ExxonMobil Refinery along the Mississippi River in December 1972.

Cancer Alley is the regional nickname given to an 184-mile (296 km) stretch of land along the Mississippi River between the Baton Rouge metropolitan area and the Gulf of Mexico, in the River Parishes of Louisiana, which contains over 350 industrial facilities that emit significant amounts of air pollution. Cancer Alley houses the largest concentration of fossil fuel and petrochemical plants and refineries in the Western Hemisphere. As of 2025, this area accounted for 25% of the petrochemical production in the United States.

Environmentalists consider the region a sacrifice zone, which is an area where pollution levels are so significant that they pose considerable dangers to the people who live there, and these people are often marginalized and under-resourced. The pollution generated by the high density of petrochemical facilities in Cancer Alley has resulted in a local risk of cancer that is 47 times greater than the acceptable threshold set by the U.S. government. The extent of the health risk in this region has been described as being in violation of human rights.

The concentration of industrial petrochemical refineries in predominately African American communities places these groups disproportionately in harm's way, as decisions about land use are often beyond their control. Lack of government action has inspired community leaders such as Sharon Lavigne to lead the charge in protesting the expansion of the petrochemical industry in Cancer Alley, as well as address the associated racial and economic disparities. Cancer Alley has been the focus of environmental justice advocates dating as far back as the 1990s, and continues to serve as a landmark example of the systemic failings that perpetuate environmental injustices.

== History ==
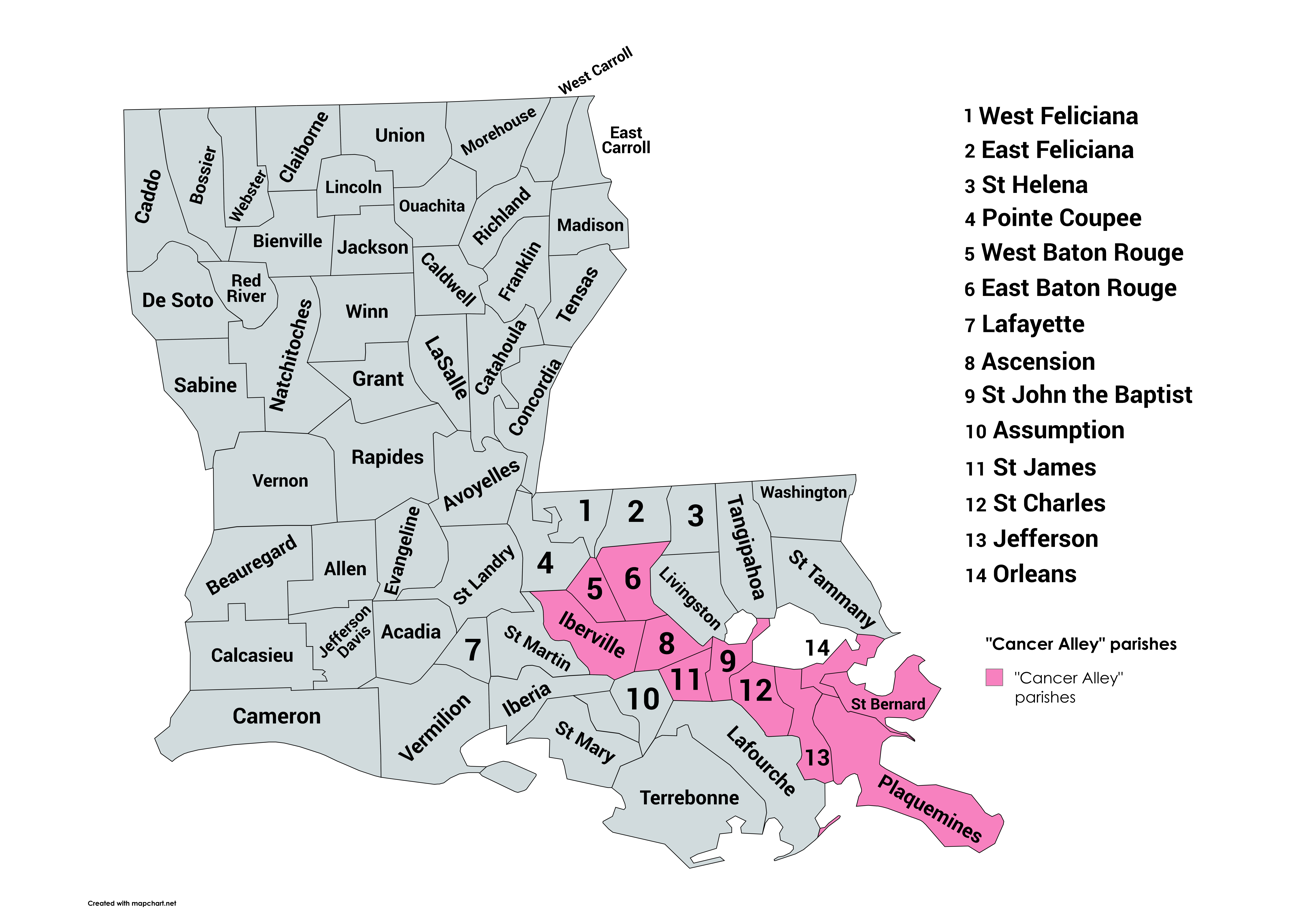
Parishes of Louisiana that comprise "Cancer Alley", marked in pink

Following an oil and gas boom around the time of World War II, a number of refineries were established along the Mississippi River near the Gulf Coast. During the 1950s, many of these facilities relocated from populous areas, such as Baton Rouge and New Orleans, to less densely populated locations. Many relocated to the small communities along the Mississippi River between New Orleans and Baton Rouge, often located on former plantation sites adjacent to communities with significant or majority African American populations.

By the 1970s, the area had a proliferation of plants producing vinyl chloride, nitrogen fertilizers, and chlorine. During this time, serious air pollution and water pollution was noted by federal agencies. A United States Environmental Protection Agency (EPA) report found 66 pollutants in New Orleans drinking water, and 31 lethal chemicals in the air of Plaquemine. In 1976, Coast Guard divers retrieving sediment samples from a bayou suffered second-degree burns on their hands. By the early 1980s, residents in the neighborhood of Good Hope had grown accustomed to regular fires at a local oil refinery, and developed their own informal evacuation plans for their occurrences. Despite the known problems with pollution, the petrochemical industry in the area continued unabated, and even continued expanding. In the early 1980s, an oil refinery purchased the land of Good Hope for expansion.

Beginning in the 1980s, locals also perceived certain species of plants and animals becoming less common. By 1988, locals began referring to an area in Chalmette in St. Bernard Parish as "Cancer Alley". The "alley" later grew to encompass an eighty-five-mile stretch along the Mississippi River stretching from New Orleans to Baton Rouge and includes the parishes of East Baton Rouge, West Baton Rouge, Iberville, Ascension, St. James, St. John the Baptist, St. Charles, Jefferson, Orleans, St. Bernard, and Plaquemines. Cancer Alley in a larger sense extends further west along the Gulf Coast into Texas to the area of Freeport, Texas.

Industrial plants emitting toxic waste in Louisiana continued to proliferate in the 21st century. According to EPA data, the number of industrial plants in Louisiana that reported their toxic releases grew from 255 to 320 from 1988 to 2017, an increase of 25%, even as the number of such plants nationwide dropped by 16% over that period.

Per a 2003 study that surveyed 11 plants in St. James Parish, researchers found that the plants employed between 4.9% and 19.4% African Americans, which is low in comparison to the overall population of the county (49.2% in 2000).

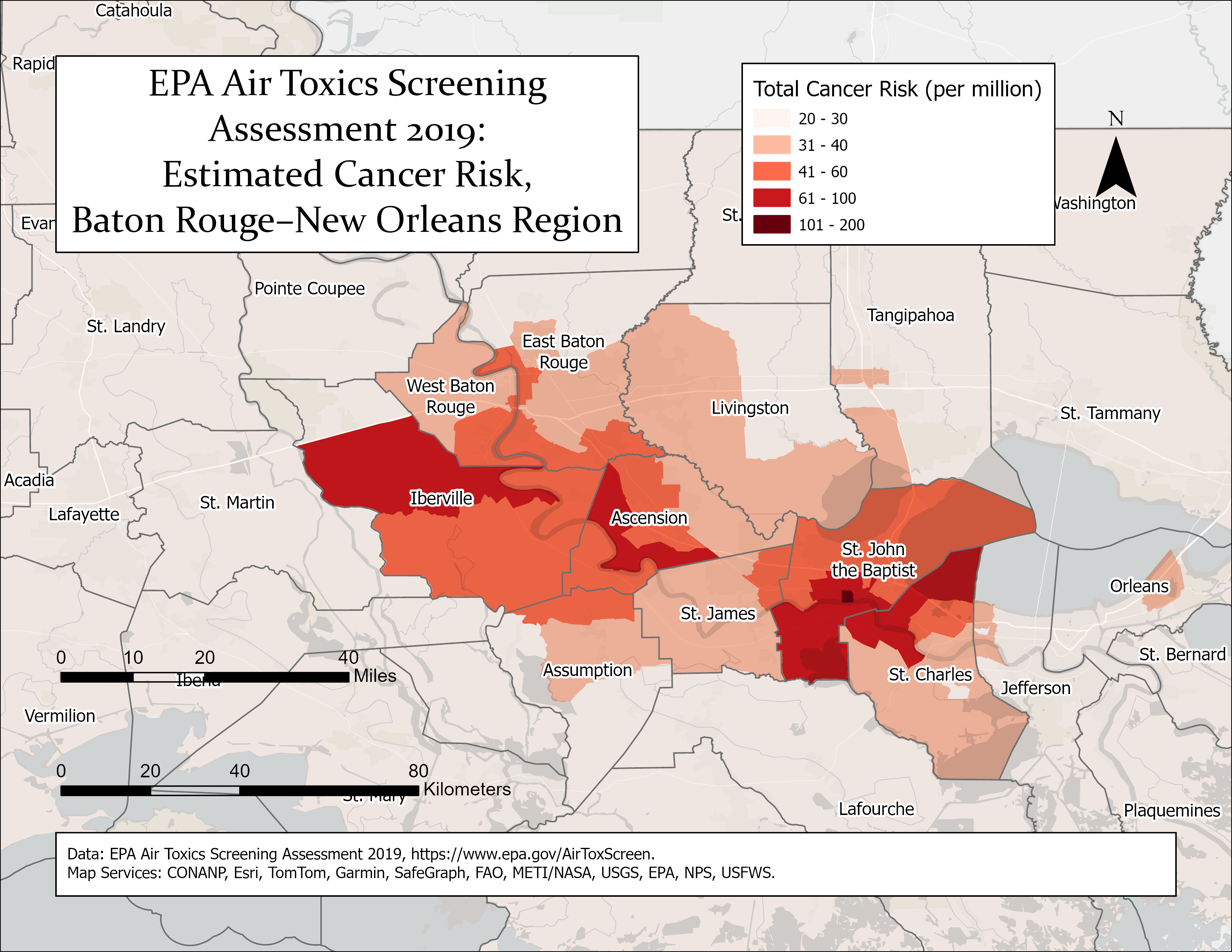
EPA-estimated cancer risk in the region

In 1969, DuPont opened a plant to manufacture the chemical chloroprene, the main ingredient in neoprene, in Reserve, Louisiana on the border with LaPlace, Louisiana. The plant was sold in 2015 to Japanese chemical company Denka. The area immediately adjacent to the Denka/DuPont neoprene plant in St. John the Baptist Parish has been recognized by the EPA as having a likelihood of its residents getting cancer from air pollution over 700 times the national average. According to EPA, it emits 99% of the nation's chloroprene pollution. EPA opened civil rights investigations over this pollution from Cancer Alley. On March 7, 2025, the Justice Department announced it was dropping the federal case against Denka's Louisiana elastomer plant, which the Biden administration had sued over alleged increased cancer risks in the local, mostly Black community. The DOJ linked the withdrawal to Trump's policy of ending federal Diversity, Equity, and Inclusion (DEI) initiatives.

== Community organizing ==
In 1996, Shintech Inc. announced that they would be creating three new polyvinyl chloride (PVC) manufacturing plants in Convent, a small majority Black community (2010 population of 711, 65.7% Black) that serves as the parish seat of St. James Parish. The state of Louisiana issued Shintech permits to proceed with the project in 1997, despite their acknowledgement that these locations would be adding 623,000 pounds of pollutants to the air annually. The residents of Convent formed a coalition called St. James Citizens for the Environment (SJCJE) that drew the attention of outside legal groups including the Tulane University Environmental Law Clinic and the Sierra Club Legal Defense Fund. In 1998, after considerable pressure and lobbying, Shintech withdrew its project plans.

In 1992, the Taiwanese-owned Formosa Plastics Corporation proposed to build a $700 million rayon and pulp processing plant in Wallace, a small majority Black community (2000 population of 570, 93.7% Black) in St. John the Baptist Parish. This plant would have been the world's largest of its kind if completed, and was expected to create 5,000 jobs. The 750 residents of the town waged a legal battle and eventually won forcing Formosa to build their plant elsewhere.

In 2018, the Formosa Plastics Corporation proposed the Sunshine Project, a $9.4 billion industrial complex to be located on the west bank of St. James Parish that is estimated to become the petrochemical and plastics project with the single greatest environmental detriment, at an estimated 13,628,086 tons of greenhouse gas emissions yearly. The proposed complex would span 2,500 acres and will be situated one mile from an elementary school, On January 15, 2020, RISE St. James, a faith-based grassroots organization of St. James Parish community members, in conjunction with the nonprofit conservation organization Center for Biological Diversity, the grassroots organization Louisiana Bucket Brigade, and the nonprofit Healthy Gulf, sued the Trump administration for permitting Formosa Plastics' proposed petrochemical complex. The lawsuit sought to invalidate the U.S. Army Corps of Engineers' fast-tracked Clean Water Act permits that the Corps issued the prior year. It had come to light that independent archaeologists that Formosa Plastics hired had discovered that enslaved people were buried in unmarked graves beneath the 2,300-acre site that Formosa planned to develop their plastics complex on. Citing violation of federal laws in the approval of destroying wetlands, the region's first and quickly dwindling line of defense against progressively-intensifying natural disasters, as well as the failure to protect the water, air, and health of the surrounding communities, and the violation of the National Historic Preservation Act in failing to protect the burial grounds of enslaved people, the lawsuit demanded the rescinding of the permits issued in September 2019 as well as the conducting of a full environmental impact study. On November 4, 2020, the U.S. Army Corps of Engineers announced its plans to suspend its permit for the Sunshine Project.

The economic stimulation and job creation that is promised with the proposal of each new plant in the area has never been fulfilled, while a tiny minority of full-time industry jobs are filled by community members who bear the brunt of the pollution burden – for example, in St. Gabriel of Iberville Parish where there are now 30 large petrochemical plants within a 10-mile radius, only 9% of the full-time industry jobs in the city are held by local residents, and at least one in four residents live in poverty. The promised economic prosperity in these major investments has yet to be delivered, but continues to be a cited reason for the continued approval of petrochemical permits.

== Criticism ==
The EPA, in both 2016 and 2020, reported that those residing in Cancer Alley are exposed to more than 10 times “the level of health risk from hazardous air pollutants” than other residents in the state. Human Rights Watch reviewed data from 12 fossil fuel and petrochemical plants operating in the Cancer Alley area from October 2020 to November 2023. Out of these 12 facilities, only one of them was “reported in compliance with all three federal laws” in the 3-year observational period. Only 2 of these facilities “were in compliance with the Clean Water Act” as well.

On January 27, 2021, President Joe Biden signed an executive order regarding environmental justice and specifically cited Cancer Alley as a hard-hit area. Louisiana Chemical Association President Greg Bowser responded to President Biden's remarks on the region, refuting claims that residents of the industrial corridor have a higher risk of developing cancer in multiple articles. Furthermore, he cited Louisiana Tumor Registry (LTR) data to support his claims. The LTR claims that there has not been an increase in cancer deaths connected to industrial pollution.

On March 2, 2021, the United Nations (UN) Human Rights Committee discussed the continued industrial projects along the Mississippi River in Louisiana. The UN council on contemporary racism strongly condemned what they defined as environmental racism in their discussion with experts and other UN officials:

This form of environmental racism poses serious and disproportionate threats to the enjoyment of several human rights of its largely African American residents, including the right to equality and non-discrimination, the right to life, the right to health, right to an adequate standard of living and cultural rights.

The sentiments stated by environmental activists were echoed by the Human Rights Commission.

As of 2019 activists and locals have disputed the conclusions of the Louisiana Tumor Registry asserting the tracts used cover large areas and the data does not allow for specific locations adjacent to chemical plants to be analyzed individually. They also posited that the data may be incomplete as those who died during the COVID-19 pandemic who also had cancer might not be included. In 2008, Louisiana health officials were unable to release the specific cases and data because of medical privacy laws.

== Government action, 2011–present ==
The U.S. Environmental Protection Agency's National Air Toxic Assessment looked at toxic emissions around the nation in 2011 and released the findings in 2015. The study found that the air in LaPlace, Louisiana, which is an area in Cancer Alley, had a higher-than-expected level of chloroprene. This subsequently caused the EPA to begin working closely with the owner of the neoprene plant in the area, Denka Performance Elastomer, and the Louisiana Department of Environmental Quality to lower chloroprene emissions. The overall goal was to lower chloroprene emissions by 85%.

The state of Louisiana says that Denka has reached the goal of lowering emissions by 85%, but some residents remain skeptical. Many residents believe that instead of reducing emissions by a percentage, the emissions should be 0.2 micrograms per cubic meter of air, which is what is considered a safe level by the EPA.

In April 2022, the EPA initiated civil rights investigations of Louisiana state agencies. The probe focused on whether the process of granting permits along the industrial corridor violated the civil rights of residents who live nearby. The probe specifically examined the Louisiana Department of Environmental Quality and the Louisiana Department of Health regarding the permitting of a Denka Performance Elastomers plant, as well as a proposed Formosa Plastics Sunshine plant and a proposed Greenfield Exports grain terminal.

In February 2023, the EPA and prosecutors in the U.S. Attorney's office for the Eastern District of Louisiana filed a complaint against Denka Performance Elastomer under Section 303 of the Clean Air Act. The complaint asserted that the company's LaPlace, Louisiana, plant posed an imminent danger to public health based on its emissions of cancer-causing chloroprene. Air monitoring near the Denka plant found chloroprene levels as high as 14 times the recommended level.

According to the EPA, air monitoring near Denka's plant has shown that chloroprene levels are as high as 14 times the recommended level of 0.2 μg/m^{3}, which has posed "an imminent and substantial endangerment" to nearby communities. Louisiana Attorney General Jeff Landry sued the EPA, challenging the government's use of the disparate impact standard of the Civil Rights Act, which says policies cannot cause disproportionate harm to people of color and continue greenlighting industrial activities in an area already overburdened by pollution. Five weeks later, the EPA dropped its Cancer Alley investigation. In February 2024, the EPA requested a delay in an impending federal trial against Denka until after the agency finalized a rule expected to tighten emission limits for chloroprene.

In April 2024, the EPA announced a new rule targeting more than 200 chemical plants across the U.S., requiring them to cut enough toxic emissions to reduce cancer risks for people living in those areas by 96 percent. It marked the first time the EPA had amended national emissions standards for hazardous organic pollutants in more than 30 years. The new rule requires plants to locate the source of toxic contamination and make repairs when emissions exceed standards. The plants are also required to install air monitors at their fence lines.

In February 2025, the Trump administration planned to dismiss the lawsuit against Denka in line with its plan to eliminate DEI programs, including environmental justice, as leading positions in the EPA were filled with former representatives or lobbyists of the oil and chemical industry.

In April of 2026, the Supreme Court of the United States handed down an opinion regarding Chevron USA Inc. v. Plaquemines Parish. The removal jurisdiction case sought to determine if oil companies, such as Chevron, were liable for their deleterious impacts on the Louisiana environment. This effort by Plaquemines Parish, which is situated along cancer alley, is a response to Louisiana's rapidly receding coastline, which has seen a loss of about 2,000 square miles of costal land since the mid-19th century. According to the EPA, Louisiana is particularly vulnerable to the compounding impact of climate change on factors such as sea level, extreme weather events, and flooding, as reflected in this legal battle to hold oil companies accountable. This case sets a precedent that similar climate liability cases fit under federal jurisdiction rather than state jurisdiction.

== Environmental impacts ==
The location of Cancer Alley also poses more environmental impacts other than air pollution. Since Cancer Alley is located closer to the Gulf of Mexico, hurricanes pose a great risk and have caused large amounts of damage in past years. These severe weather events in the area have resulted in the additional release of environmental contaminants into nearby communities. For example, in 2005, Hurricane Katrina caused almost 11 million gallons of oil to spill into the water near New Orleans. Hurricane Harvey in 2017 caused power outages that led to unrefrigerated chemicals in a plant in Houston decomposing and igniting into a large fireball. In 2020, Hurricane Laura caused a fire at a plant that produced pool chemicals, which led to chlorine gas being burned for three days.

One of the largest environmental impacts happened when Hurricane Ida hit in 2021. The storm's projected path was through the industrial region. The threat of the hurricane's destruction caused the industries located in Cancer Alley to release unprocessed chemicals and gases into the air via "flaring." Even though flaring causes chemicals to be released into the air, the process is legal in emergencies. After the hurricane, residents were not only left with damaged homes but also more pollution in the air and water than usual.

Another concern regarding climate change and its impacts on Louisiana's environment is rising sea levels and coastal erosion. This poses a disproportionate risk to costal communities and infrastructure as flooding and storm surges become more common. The EPA suggests that these risks posed by rising sea levels will have monumental impacts on local economies due to the prevalence of sea-level cities, oil and gas industries, and other important infrastructure. These disproportionate vulnerabilities to the environmental impacts of climate change exemplify how coastal communities, such as those along Cancer Alley, are already experiencing the negative impacts of environmental degradation.

== Environmental racism ==
Many scholars and residents of Cancer Alley have referred to the area as a "frontline example of environmental racism". Environmental racism can be defined as the institutional rules, regulations, policies, or government/corporate decisions that deliberately target certain communities for locally undesirable land uses and lax enforcement of zoning and environmental laws, resulting in communities being disproportionately exposed to toxic and hazardous waste based on race. Environmental racism can also be caused by several factors. These factors include intentional neglect, the alleged need for a receptacle for pollutants in urban areas, and a lack of institutional power and low land values of people of color. It is also a well-documented and well-known fact that communities of color and low-income communities are disproportionately impacted by polluting industries and lax regulation of these industries. 75% of Black Americans are reported to more likely live in communities dubbed as "fence-line", communities in close proximity to sites of pollution and industry. Over 1 million of Black Americans are reported to live within a half-mile radius of oil and gas wells.

Another reason for the disproportionate siting of industrial facilities in poor and Black communities is the “Not In My Backyard Movement” (NIMBY). Primarily White neighborhoods rallied together against the petrochemical companies that were being placed in their communities. As a result, these companies shifted their sights and locations towards poor communities of color. NIMBY’s growth occurred in the 1970’s at the same time public awareness about health risks related to pollution from these waste facilities grew. These White communities had social power and “clout” that low-income communities of color did not have.

In 2023, the Environmental Protection Agency found significant evidence that Louisiana regulators’ actions and/or inactions have resulted and continue to result in a range of adverse impacts on African American residents in Cancer Alley.

== Activism and environmental justice ==
The environmental justice movement seeks to address the disproportionate impacts of environmental degradation suffered by low-income and minority communities across the world. Many communities that face the largest burdens of environmental degradation, such as pollution, tend to be made up of low-income and minority populations. These communities often have little political or financial power, so they advocate for change through protest and community organization. Due to this, low-income and minority communities will resort to grassroots activism to protect themselves. Many have also cited the EPA's failure to be consistent in their enforcement of federal environmental laws.

In September 2022, environmental justice advocates in southern Louisiana were able to declare victory after two decisions denied two major petrochemical complexes from moving forward. State District Court Judge Trudy White released a decision that reversed and vacated 14 air regulations permits that the Louisiana Department of Environmental Quality (LDEQ) had issued for the proposed Formosa Plastics Group complex in the town of Welcome. The town already has multiple oil refineries and industrial plants and is located in Cancer Alley.

Another group that has been actively fighting against the petrochemical industry in Cancer Alley is Rise St. James. Rise St. James is a faith-based grassroots organization that fights for environmental justice and works to defeat the proliferation of petrochemical industries in St. James Parish, Louisiana. The organization successfully defeated the construction of a $1.25 billion plastics manufacturing plant in 2019 and is currently fighting to prevent Formosa Plastics from building a multibillion-dollar plant in the parish. Rise St. James is also committed to educating the community and those outside of the community about the chemicals they breathe in every day. The organization's website includes a "Chemical of the Month" page and provides information on a specific chemical and how much it is found in certain areas of Cancer Alley.

== In popular culture ==
British industrial metal band Godflesh used a photograph of a cemetery located in Cancer Alley as the cover art for their 1996 album, Songs of Love and Hate.

Sociologist Arlie Russell Hochschild discusses the environmental and health conditions in Cancer Alley, as well as the socioeconomic and political ramifications, in her 2016 book Strangers in Their Own Land.

== See also ==
Comparable examples

- Love Canal
- Triangle of death (Italy)
- Valley of the Drums

General

- Cancer cluster
- Environmental justice
- Environmental racism
- Environmental racism in the United States

Legal

- McCastle v. Rollins Environmental Services
- Chevron USA Inc. v. Plaquemines Parish
