= Blue Vinyl =

- DVD cover
- Directed by: Daniel B. Gold; Judith Helfand
- Produced by: Daniel B. Gold; Judith Helfand; Julia D. Parker
- Starring: William Baggett; Charlie Cray; Daniel B. Gold
- Cinematography: Daniel B. Gold
- Edited by: Sari Gilman
- Music by: Sam Broussard; Stephen Thomas Cavit; Terry Dame; Marty Ehrlich; Four Piece Suit
- Production company: Toxic Comedy Pictures
- Distributed by: HBO
- Release dates: January 10, 2002 (Sundance); May 5, 2002 (HBO)
- Running time: 98 minutes
- Country: United States
- Language: English

Blue Vinyl is a 2002 documentary film directed by Daniel B. Gold and Judith Helfand. With a lighthearted tone, the film follows one woman's quest for an environmentally sound cladding for her parents' house in Merrick, Long Island, New York. It also investigates the many negative health effects of polyvinyl chloride in its production, use and disposal, focusing on the communities of Lake Charles and Mossville, Louisiana, and Venice, Italy. Filming for Blue Vinyl began in 1994. It was aired on HBO as part of the series America Undercover.

== Synopsis ==
The documentary comes out of Helfand's desire to have a safer environment for her parents to live in, after she discovers that they covered their house in vinyl siding. Throughout the documentary, Helfand intends on revealing that vinyl siding creates a dangerous living environment for people living in the house covered with vinyl siding, and for the environment around them.

To explore her theories, Helfand and her team visit three different locations. The first is Lake Charles, Louisiana, the home of one of the biggest PVC plants in the United States. She interviews various local residents and learns that most of them know the problems associated with the plant, but either don't see ways to fix them or don't have any desire to fix them. Helfand seems to become a bit frustrated with the lackadaisical attitude that some of the residents have in this section. Also during her time in Lake Charles, she meets some members of the Vinyl Institute, an organization that defends the interests of the vinyl industry, and representatives from the Institute initially refuse her questions about any harmful effects from PVC production. Helfand meets Elaine Ross as well, whose husband was killed as a result of working in the PVC production plant owned by Vista, and learns about her lawyer, William "Billy" Baggett, whose work in her case is starting to make a serious change towards safer plants and better regulations.

After spending time in Lake Charles, Helfand and her team travel to Venice, Italy, where they meet more citizens hurt by large vinyl productions plants. The problem, they discover, is a worldwide issue. Helfand meets and interviews Dr. Caesar Maltone, a biologist whose experiments helped to create the basis for most of the lawsuits against vinyl production plants around the world. The documentary reveals that a few large vinyl production companies signed a secrecy agreement to make sure Maltone's findings stay secret from the rest of the world. The documentary focuses mainly on the Italian company EniChem, which is located in Venice and was the focus of Maltone's study. But, the vinyl producers do set certain rules and regulations on vinyl productions plants to try to avoid excessive lawsuits. For example, they declare that the limit of exposure that any given worker will have in the process of vinyl production is 1 ppm (part per million). But, after Helfand consults with Maltone again, he reveals that no limits that companies put can fully prevent exposure when production happens.

Helfand returns again to Louisiana, this time to a community near Lake Charles named Mossville. This community was so hurt by the pollution from nearby vinyl production plants that their groundwater supply was affected, and the community is largely deserted. Because of this disaster, along with problems in Lake Charles, Helfand showcases the work of the Louisiana Bucket Brigade, which is a community organization that works with homemade air quality testers to make sure their community is held to the right environmental standards.

From Mossville, Helfand travels to California to discuss some alternatives to the vinyl siding on her parents' house, and learns about many different alternatives that are used in property building in lieu of traditional vinyl siding. To end the film, she finds a safe alternative to vinyl siding by using repurposed wood, and gives her parents' house good protection from the elements, while being environmentally and economically conscious.

== Background ==
=== History ===
PVC or polyvinyl chloride production dates back to the 19th century but began being widely used in the 1950s when companies discovered its versatility. By the 1980s, 20 companies were producing PVC. The advancements in chemical makeup made the material ideal for construction. Its low cost, durability, and processability made it a widely used product outside of construction into markets like IT, healthcare, and transportation The market for PVC extended out of construction into beauty products like aerosol hairspray. PVC was largely deemed harmless until four workers died of angiosarcoma in a PVC production factory in Louisville, Kentucky. After this, the vinyl industry developed a standard of one part per million (1 ppm) as the acceptable level during the production of PVC and also removed PVC from hairspray products (award of commendation article). The Vinyl Institute claimed that only resin workers were at risk during the production and that the new (1 ppm) standard protected against that.

Hefland investigates these newer concerns with the production of PVC and tries to determine whether companies like the vinyl institute were committed to protecting their consumers with these types of guidelines.

=== Research ===
Blue Vinyl teamed up with Working Films to create the My House is Your House Campaign to turn the film into an organizing tool by increasing deliberate consumer advocacy and influencing industry change. The My House is Your House campaign sparked out of this documentary to continue the efforts after an attempt to inspire consumers through the film. This campaign focuses on the harmful effects of Polyvinyl Chloride production also known as "PVC" or "Vinyl." 75% of all PVC is used in construction materials. According to this campaign, PVC plastic is considered one of the most detrimental in terms of harmful effects. During production, it emits toxic byproducts including dioxin, which has been linked to many cancers, neurological damage, respiratory problems, and birth defects among others.

In addition to the health risks associated with PVC production, environmentalists associated with the film suggest that dioxins released through PVC plants do not disappear but are absorbed by animals and humans. PVC is also non-recyclable and highly flammable causing complications with the life cycle of this construction product.

=== Proposed alternatives ===
The documentary communicates the issue of uninformed consumers that purchase PVC as a cheap and efficient building material. Helfand hoped the film would bring light to the lack of understanding about materials used in the majority of Americans' homes. After her dissatisfaction with settling with vinyl, Judith seeks alternatives for housing construction. The My House Your House Campaign served as an education and advocacy focused effort was developed after the film to educate consumers about and take action against the use and production of PVC-based products and their life cycle.

Helfand and the My House is Your House campaign assessed the impact of the life cycle of PVC, the affordability of PVC versus other construction materials, and the possibilities of incorporating these into routine construction practices. They provide links to environmental organizations that are committed to offering alternatives outside of the PVC market.

On the campaign's website there is a list of alternative materials that might present less consequences than vinyl. These materials include piping, siding, roofing membranes, wall coverings, and furniture.

== Reception ==
=== Critiques ===
It was a complete shock to everyone when Blue Vinyl had come out on DVD because it exposed the dangers of a commonly used substance. Vinyl or Polyvinyl is a not only cheap but easily attainable through your local store or hospital. A couple examples of the many things PVC is put into is computers, cellphones, cars, dashboards, and hospital iv bags. The film explains the dangers of what could happen if this substance goes near a flame considering it is highly flammable and will release toxic fumes when burned. Many of the PVC plant workers have been diagnosed with cancer because of the toxic fumes that this vinyl contains. This film compares Lake Charles to an Italian city because they have both been used as a dumping ground and thus effecting the environment. PVC is said to be not only dangerous when produced but also when disposed. The corporations are exposed for letting this substance effect the communities it is produced in and for profiting off of the people in the communities. Most construction areas use PVC because of the many ways it could be used to build a house.

The film received scrutiny when the DVD was released with portions missing from the original broadcast. Lori Sanzone, a woman diagnosed with angiosarcoma of liver (ASL), a type of cancer associated with vinyl exposure, had her diagnosis changed to a different disease. Also, after an out-of-court settlement, an Italian court ended a lawsuit talked about in Blue Vinyl. Counter to the accolades, many pointed out that there were inaccuracies in the original film. The Vinyl Institute president, Tim Burns, issued a statement announcing changes between the film and DVD. He noted that a star witness supporting the claim that exposure to vinyl production can cause ASL, Lori Sanzone, is missing from the DVD version. (In the original film she was pictured as someone who had developed ASL from working in the plant). Burns claims that she did not have ASL and only worked in a PVC factory for seven days. He notes this led to Sanzone's case was dismissed in January 2004.

Burns also notes the misuse of the case against Italian Vinyl producers which was dismissed in court before the production of the film. This is kept in the DVD version with a title rolling with this information at the end.

== See also ==
- Vinyl siding
- Louisiana Bucket Brigade
