= Louisiana Bucket Brigade =

US nonprofit organization

- Abbreviation: LABB
- Formation: 2000
- Founder: Anne Rolfes
- Type: 501(c)(3) nonprofit organization
- Purpose: Environmental health, environmental justice, community-based air quality monitoring
- Headquarters: New Orleans, Louisiana, United States

The Louisiana Bucket Brigade is a 501(c)(3) nonprofit environmental health and justice organization based in New Orleans, Louisiana. Founded in 2000 by Anne Rolfes, the organization works with communities neighboring state oil refineries and chemical plants to address air quality issues.

== Background ==
"Buckets" that sampled air quality were pioneered by attorney Edward L. Masry in 1995 after he and Erin Brockovich fell ill when exposed to fumes from a petroleum refinery in Contra Costa County, California. Unsatisfied with the monitoring conducted by government authorities, Masry hired an environmental engineer to design a low cost device which community activists could use to monitor toxin levels themselves.

== Mission ==
The mission of the LABB is to "support communities' use of grassroots action to create informed, sustainable neighborhoods free from industrial pollution." To accomplish this goal, the organization uses the bucket to take air samples in residential areas that are located near oil refineries and chemical plants. The LABB compiles several air samples from different citizens around one area; with this evidence they strive to reduce the levels of pollution.

== Bucket technology ==
Designed to function like the Summa canisters used by government and industry, the buckets used in a Bucket Brigade are far cheaper and have comparable results. Air is drawn into a Tedlar bag housed inside a five-gallon bucket. The bag is sealed and sent to a laboratory for analysis. The bag's contents are analyzed using gas chromatography–mass spectrometry (GC-MS) and compared to a library of toxic gases. While the buckets cost only $75 each, the GC-MS samples cost $500.

== Organizing in Louisiana ==
The community of Mossville is located in between Westlake and Sulphur across the Calcasieu River from the city of Lake Charles in Calcasieu Parish, Louisiana. Forty of the fifty-three industrial facilities in Calcasieu Parish are located within 10 miles of Mossville. These facilities represent the largest concentration of vinyl plastic manufacturers in the U.S., a coal-fired power plant, oil refineries, and chemical production facilities.

In September 1998, Mossville residents of "fenceline communities" formed a bucket brigade and began taking samples. The samples revealed violations of Louisiana standards for vinyl chloride, ethylene dichloride, and benzene. One sample found carcinogenic benzene in excess of 220 times the State's standard.

In the following year, after much media attention, the Environmental Protection Agency confirmed pollution levels higher than detected by the bucket brigade. Some facilities were fined and new monitoring devices were installed. By 1999, bucket brigades had spread throughout the cancer alley of Louisiana, leading to the formation of the Louisiana Bucket Brigade. The organization gives grants to community groups to continue bucket monitoring.

Communities currently participating in the Bucket Brigade include Alsen, Baton Rouge, Chalmette, Mossville, New Sarpy, Norco, Louisiana, Port Arthur, Texas, and Durban, South Africa.

The Louisiana Bucket Brigade is featured in the 2002 documentary film Blue Vinyl.

== See also ==
- Sustainability
- Biodiversity
- Global warming
