= Mossville Environmental Action Now =

Mossville Environmental Action Now has worked since the 1980s as environmental justice advocates to address the industrial toxins that pollute their community, Mossville, Louisiana. The organization is significant for its role in advocating for people affected by pollution.

MEAN became incorporated as non-profit, tax-exempt organization in the state of Louisiana in 1999. In 2005, MEAN became party to a petition before the Inter-American Commission on Human Rights seeking to hold the United States government accountable for violation of Mossville residents’ human rights. Mossville Environmental Action Now is one of the first environmental justice organizations to bring the US government before an international human rights body on charges of violating a community's right to a clean environment and environmental racism.
