= Mossville, Louisiana =

Unincorporated community in Louisiana, U.S.

Coordinates: 30°14′52″N 93°18′33″W

Mossville is a small, predominantly African American unincorporated community on the outskirts of Lake Charles in Calcasieu Parish, Louisiana, United States. It is part of the Lake Charles Metropolitan Statistical Area and is sandwiched between the much larger and predominantly white towns of Sulphur to the west and Westlake to the east.

Sasol owns a large petrochemical plant which directly abuts the town of Westlake to the east. Sasol announced a westward expansion of their facility which entailed buying out and relocating almost all of the residents north of Old Spanish Trail in Mossville.

The community is featured in the 2002 documentary film Blue Vinyl, which focuses on the health effects of nearby polyvinyl chloride factories on community members. The film features footage of the Louisiana Bucket Brigade collecting air samples to determine the toxicity of the community's air. Some of its last residents were documented in the 2019 film Mossville, When Great Trees Fall which played at festivals around the world and broadcast nationally on PBS.

== History ==
Mossville was founded by Jack Moss, an ex-slave, beginning in 1790. This was more than fifty years before the creation of Imperial Calcasieu Parish. Over the years the hamlet grew to more than 600 residents but was never incorporated. The main roads are the Old Spanish Trail (East Burton Street), Prater Road, and extends west to the Sulphur city limits and Evergreen Road.

The town was settled by former enslaved Africans who were granted the land through a "fee-simple title acquired by squatters rights." In this manner, anyone who agreed to improve the property while residing for a specified number of years could attain ownership.

After the Civil War, these individuals mostly from nearby farms, settled on the land and began growing crops and raising cattle.

The area remained rural until the early 1900s, when the Locke-Moore Company built a sawmill. Lumbering became the major industry and was later joined by sugar refinement.

The greatest period of growth occurred in the 1940s and 1950s, when petrochemical and industrial plants moved into the area. Today, these plants remain the primary source of employment for Mossville residents.

The massive Sasol chemical plant project is physically changing the Mossville landscape and geography. The town has almost no resemblance to what it looked liked before the chemical plant project.

== Demographics ==
As Mossville is unincorporated and is not designated as a census designated place, an exact population is undetermined. The much larger census tract to which it belongs indicates a population of 3,420 of which 344 are African American as of the 2020 U.S. Census.

== Sasol ==
Vista Chemical Company purchased Conoco Chemical Company in July 1984. In March 1996, Vista Chemical Company became Condea Vista Company. Sasol bought Condea Vista in 2000. Sasol was originally created during the apartheid-era South Africa as a synthetic oil company that helped the apartheid South African government avoid the late 1960s international oil embargo. Sasol has since grown into a multinational petrochemical company that has expanded well beyond its original mission of producing synthetic fuels. It trades on the Johannesburg Stock Exchange (JSE: SOL) and the New York Stock Exchange (NYSE: SSL) and is predominantly run by Africans.

The Sasol project that includes the ethane cracker complex, over 3 square miles with an estimated at $8.1 billion cost, and is named the Lake Charles Chemical Projects. This replaces the previously named Ethane Cracker Projects and Lake Charles Cracker Projects.

All of the streets north of Old Spanish Trail within the Mossville community has been absorbed into Sasol by the property being bought through the voluntary land purchase program and closed to the public. These streets include VCM Plant road, Center street, 1st through 8th avenue, Michigan avenue, Lincoln avenue, Laurel avenue, and Rigmaiden avenue. Evergreen street near the Sulphur city limits is also included in the closures.

In August 2013 Sasol opened an office on Old Spanish Trail to facilitate the Voluntary Property Purchase Program and extended the early signup part until November. The program covers 883 lots (an area around 620 acres) in Mossville and the predominantly white Brentwood subdivision that is on the south side of Old Spanish Trail. Property owners that occupy their homes are offered $100,000 minimum and 60% of the appraised value, based on a complicated appraisal system, $75,000 for Rental property owners, and $5,000 for unimproved property. All property owners get a $500 professional advice allowance and those that qualify early get an additional $1,000. The firm Advocates for Environmental Human Rights in New Orleans is representing residents that have not agreed to the buyout seeking to address problems including disability assistance, avoiding financial hardship, and that the program offer is non-negotiable. 62 residents of Mossville and 2 residents of Brentwood are not expected to leave. Heirship rights must also be considered as there could be as many as 80 heirs.

Sasol, through a $275,000 donation, funded the Mossville History Project with the Imperial Calcasieu Museum. The goal is to "capture, record, preserve and make available Mossville’s written and oral history."

== Controversy ==
There has been an ongoing controversy concerning Mossville residents and area pollution. In 1993 a pipeline (built in 1947) transferring ethylene dichloride was found to be leaking into the Calcasieu estuary. The company estimated that 1.6 million pounds had leaked but other sources gave estimates of from 19 to 47 million pounds. Citizens claimed that ethylene dichloride had leaked into the water system and a lawsuit was settled for $47 million.

Mossville is adjacent to multiple industrial plants in the neighboring town of Westlake and include an oil refinery, several petrochemical plants, and one of the country's largest concentrations of manufacturers of vinyl chloride which is the main ingredient in polyvinyl chloride, or the plastic known as PVC.

The Mossville Environmental Action Now (MEAN) was organized in 1998 by a group of local residents. MEAN had the help of Greenpeace to convince a federal agency within the Centers for Disease Control and Prevention to conduct toxicological testing. The Agency for Toxic Substances and Disease Registry drew blood from 28 Mossville residents. The screenings were essentially looking for dioxins and dioxin-like compounds, also known as some of the most hazardous chemicals in science. The toxicology results showed that the average dioxin level among the Mossville community was triple that of the general United States population.

== See also ==
- Mossville Environmental Action Now
