= Baton Rouge Refinery =

Oil refinery in Louisiana, US

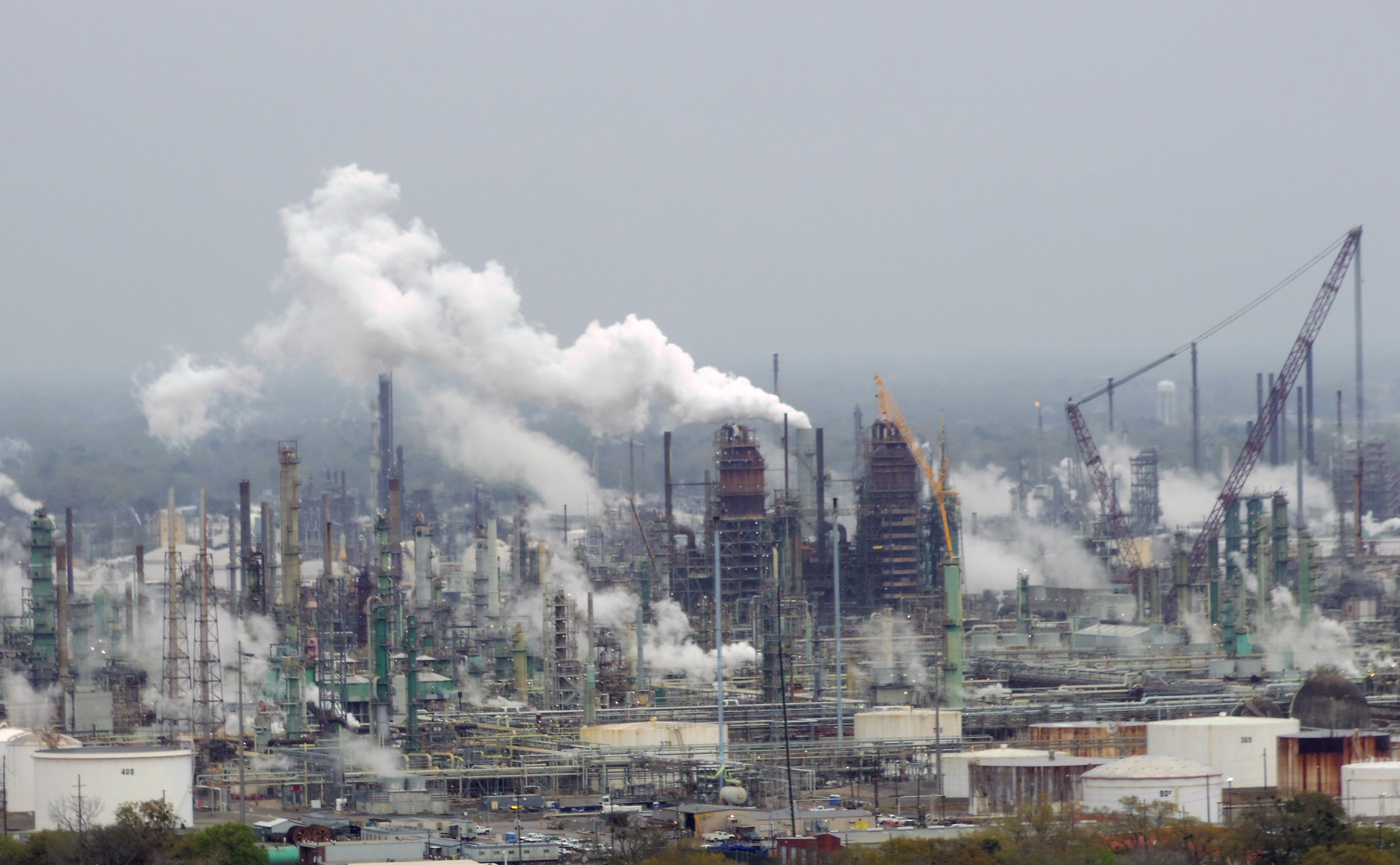
- Baton Rouge Refinery seen from the Louisiana State Capitol, looking north, 2017

- Location of the Baton Rouge Refinery in Louisiana, United States
- Location: Baton Rouge, Louisiana, United States; 30°29′1″N 91°10′50″W

Refinery details
- Owner: ExxonMobil
- Opened: 1909
- Capacity: 540,000 barrels per day (86,000 m^{3}/d)
- No. of employees: 4000

ExxonMobil's Baton Rouge Refinery in Baton Rouge, Louisiana is the sixth-largest oil refinery in the United States and seventeenth-largest in the world, with an input capacity of 540,000 barrels (86,000 m^{3}) per day as of January 1, 2020. The refinery is the site of the first commercial fluid catalytic cracking plant that began processing at the refinery on May 25, 1942.

== History ==
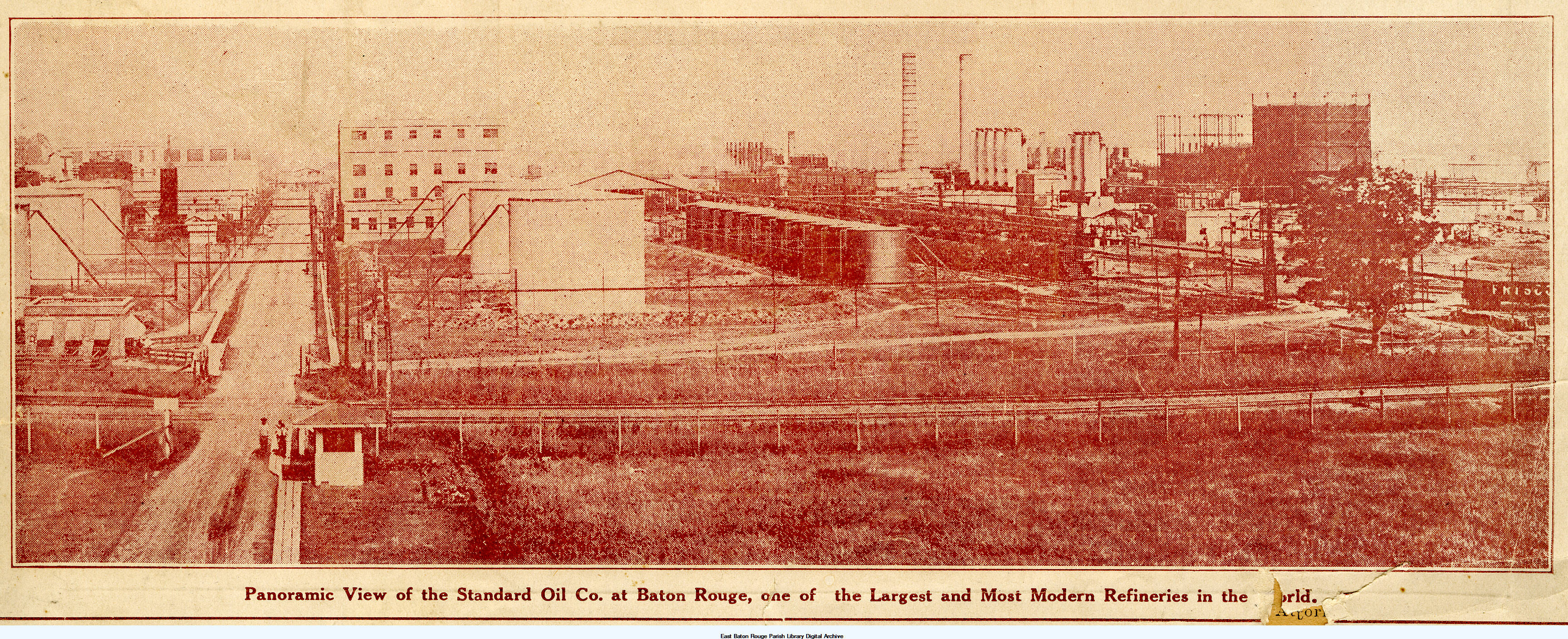
Refinery in Baton Rouge in 1916

Standard Oil first erected the refinery in 1909. Today's facility is part of a complex made of nine individual plants across the region. The main plant is located on the east bank of the Mississippi River. There are about 6,300 workers spread across these sites, including 4,000 direct employees (the rest are contractors).

In 2013 Genesis Energy LP announced an investment of $125 million to improve ExxonMobil's existing assets in the Baton Rouge area. The investment includes plans to build an 18-mile (29 km), 20-inch (51 cm) diameter crude oil pipeline that connects Genesis Energy's Port Hudson terminal, to ExxonMobil's Baton Rouge refinery.

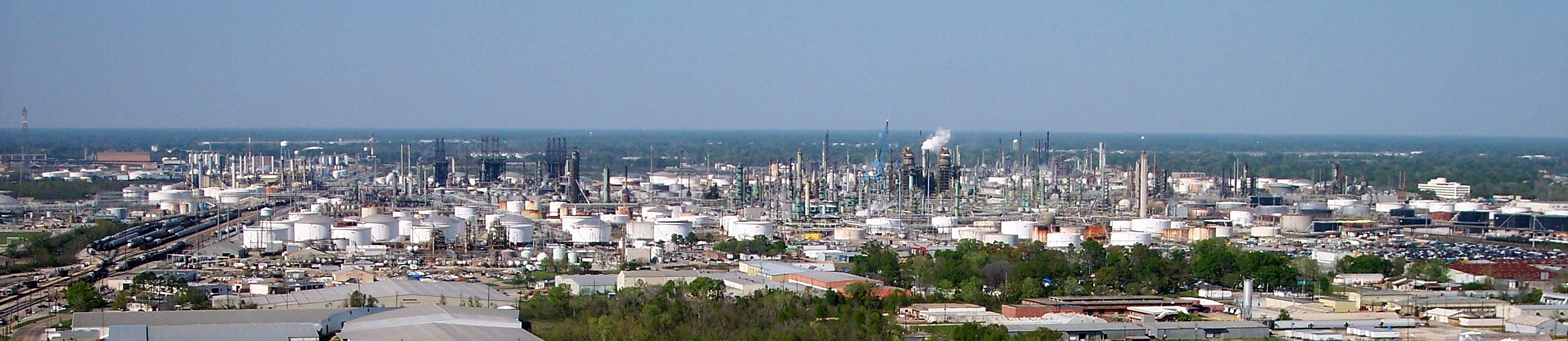
The refinery seen from the Capitol tower in 2009

== Units ==
=== Petroleum refining units ===
According to ExxonMobil's filings with the US DOE's Energy Information Agency, the unit capacities for the Baton Rouge Refinery are presented below:

Unit	Capacity in BPCD
Total Refinery Nameplate	544,600
Atmospheric Distillation	544,600
Vacuum Distillation	254,000
Delayed Coking	123,500
FCC	243,000
Hydrocracker	27,000
ULSD Hydrotreating	215,800
Gasoline & Naphtha Hydrotreating	261,000
Naphtha Reforming	80,000
Alkylation	41,000
Lubricants Production	16,500
Petcoke mt	31,525

The refinery undertook a $230 million investment to modernize the crude unit and expand crude flexibility as part of the BRRIC program with plans to increase exports of clean fuels. The project involved up to 600 contractors and took place over 3 years.

ExxonMobil is also considering a biofuels project to be constructed at the Baton Rouge site.

=== Electricity generation ===
The refinery operates is own powerplant with the following detail:

Unit name	Status	Fuel(s)	Capacity (MW)	Technology	CHP	Start year
CTG1	Operating	fossil gas: natural gas	85	gas turbine	yes	1990

=== PetroChemical production ===
The ExxonMobil Chemical division operates a steam cracker that is integrated with the refinery and has an output of 975,000 mt per year of ethylene.

== Environmental permits ==
The refinery operates with a Title V Air Major permit covering its emissions. The facility ID is LA0000002203300015 for the air permit which is the most important permit controlling the emissions thresholds of the plant.

== Greenhouse gas emissions history ==
As a major emitting facility, The ExxonMobil Baton Rouge Refinery and Petrochemical Site must report its complete greenhouse gas emissions to the EPA every year subject to the EPA's Greenhouse Gas Reporting Program. The Baton Rouge reports as four separate facilities but with the integrated refinery and olefins unit being the largest and accounting for >95% of emissions. The greenhouse gas emissions by year are reported below:

Year	Total Reported Direct Emissions	CO2 Emissions Non-Biogenic	Methane Emissions	Nitrous Oxide Emissions
	metric ton	metric ton	metric ton	metric ton
2023	5,914,862	5,883,262	17,160	14,440

The Baton Rouge Refinery is one of the ten largest emitting refineries in the United States according to Reuters. However, it is also a top ten refinery in size and complexity and is deeply integrated with its petrochemical business.

== See also ==
- Cancer Alley
- Atmospheric distillation of crude oil
- HF Acid Alkylation
- Cracking (chemistry)
- Delayed coker
