= Louisiana Department of Environmental Quality =

State agency of Louisiana, USA

The Louisiana Department of Environmental Quality (LDEQ; French: Département de Qualité Environnemental de Louisiane) is a state agency of Louisiana that monitors the environment of the state. It is headquartered in the Galvez Building in downtown Baton Rouge.

== Structure ==
The Department of Environmental Quality is split up into 5 sections:

- Office of the Secretary
- Office of Environmental Assessment
- Office of Environmental Compliance
- Office of Environmental Services
- Office of Management and Finance

== History ==
The Stream Control Commission from 1940 to 1979 was the first regulatory commission dealing with water in Louisiana. Typed transcripts for each SCC meeting during the 1970s exist in the archives of the DEQ.The transcripts list each facility discussed at the meeting. "In most cases, the regulations are contained within the proceedings themselves."

The DEQ publishes annual reports since 2016.

== See also ==
- Climate change in Louisiana
