= Plug-in electric vehicles in Louisiana =

As of February 2023, there were 7,150 electric vehicles registered in Louisiana.

== Government policy ==
As of May 2022, the state government offered tax rebates of up to $2,500 for electric vehicle purchases.

In June 2022, the state government introduced an annual registration fee of $110 for electric vehicles.

== Charging stations ==
As of May 2023, there were 191 public charging station locations with 488 charging ports in Louisiana. As of July 2022, there were 12 public DC charging stations in Louisiana.

The Infrastructure Investment and Jobs Act, signed into law in November 2021, allocates US$75 million to charging stations in Louisiana.

== By region ==
=== Alexandria ===
As of August 2022, there were 38 electric vehicles registered in Rapides Parish, and none registered in Grant Parish.

As of August 2022, there were 2 public charging stations in Alexandria.

=== Baton Rouge ===
As of 2022, there were 48 public charging stations in Baton Rouge.

=== Lafayette ===
The first public charging stations in Lafayette opened in July 2019.

=== Monroe ===
As of November 2021, there was one public charging station in Monroe.

=== New Orleans ===
In January 2022, the New Orleans city council unanimously passed an ordinance requiring that the city's light-duty vehicle fleet be transitioned entirely to electric by 2025. The first electric vehicles were added to the fleet in March 2023.
