= Chevron USA Inc. v. Plaquemines Parish =

- Supreme Court of the United States

Argued January 12, 2026 Decided April 17, 2026
- Full case name: Chevron USA Incorporated, et al. v. Plaquemines Parish, Louisiana, et al.
- Docket no.: 24-813
- Citations: 608 U.S. ___ (more)

Holding
- Chevron demonstrated a connection between its crude oil production and its federal wartime aviation fuel production, thus qualifying for removal to federal courts.

Court membership
- Chief Justice John Roberts Associate Justices Clarence Thomas · Samuel Alito; Sonia Sotomayor · Elena Kagan; Neil Gorsuch · Brett Kavanaugh; Amy Coney Barrett · Ketanji Brown Jackson

Case opinions
- Majority: Thomas, joined by Roberts, Sotomayor, Kagan, Gorsuch, Kavanaugh, Barrett
- Concurrence: Jackson
- Alito took no part in the consideration or decision of the case.

Chevron USA Inc. v. Plaquemines Parish, 608 U.S. ____ (2026), was a United States Supreme Court case involving the removal jurisdiction for a lawsuit brought by several parishes in Louisiana against Chevron and ExxonMobil over violations of the state's environmental protections, which had been shown to contribute to the loss of wetlands along the Louisiana coastline. After the parishes had won their case in state courts and penalizing the companies with a $745 million fine, Chevron moved to argue that the case should have been held in federal courts. The Supreme Court agreed in an 8–0 decision, determining that Chevron had shown that their crude oil production was connected to their aviation fuel production during World War II under federal government contracts, and thus should be under jurisdiction of federal courts.

== Background ==
John M. Barry, an historian that had written about the Great Mississippi Flood of 1927, observed the destruction caused by Hurricane Katrina in 2005 to the Louisiana marshlands, and discovered from his research that the excessive flooding resulted from poor design of the levees meant to hold back water. He became a vocal proponent to push for new levees and other means to prevent future flooding, and was appointed as vice-president of the Southeast Louisiana Flood Protection Authority board (SLFPA-East) in 2007. The state agencies, including SLFPA-East, evaluated various options and built out the Coastal Master Plan that was published in 2012. The Master Plan would cost $50 billion to implement but had support from both the scientific and the oil and gas industry. Some cost from this was to be funded from payouts from the 2010 Deepwater Horizon oil spill, but still required a large cost. Barry had proposed that the oil and gas companies that drilled in the coastal marshlands had contributed 36% between canal excavation and erosion from the removal of underground oil and gas to the loss of an estimated 2,000 square miles (5,200 km^{2}) of land, and thus should pay 36% ($18 billion) of the costs for the plan. The oil and gas companies refused to contribute financially, insisting taxpayers cover the costs.

Separately in 2013, SLPFA-East and several parishes filed a wide range of lawsuits against the oil and gas companies for failing to meet the state law. The SLFPA-East lawsuits targeted 97 companies, which drew immediate criticism from the oil and gas industry as well as state governor Bobby Jindal, who was concerned of the lawsuits' impact on jobs. Jindal was able to convince the SLFPA-East committee to require more expertise from its members, preventing Barry's appointing from being renewed, and after several failed attempts with the state legislature, signed into law a provision that the SFLPA-East agency could not bring lawsuits against the oil and gas industry. The new law was challenged by SLFPA-East in state court, but the oil and gas argued the case should be removed to federal jurisdiction. Federal district judge Nannette Jolivette Brown agreed that the case should be of federal jurisdiction, and further dismissed the suit since the oil and gas company did not have similar responsibility under federal laws. The United States Court of Appeals for the Fifth Circuit upheld both rules on appeal, and the Supreme Court opted not to take the case by 2017.

The dismissal of SLFPA-East did not stop any of the parishes' 42 cases against the oil and gas companies, filed at the state level. As with the SLPFA-East case, the oil and gas companies argued for federal jurisdiction. One specific case, involving the Plaquemines Parish and Chevron Corporation, was challenged four times by Chevron to remove to federal jurisdiction. Chervon argued that because some of the wells had been drilled during World War II to increase aviation fuel production under federal contracts, the case must be heard at the federal level under removal jurisdiction. Moving the case to federal courts was considered to be favorable and avoid potential hostility from state courts. In the most-recent denial in 2022, federal district judge Martin L.C. Feldman found that Chevron failed to make its case for removal since the suits included drilling activities long after the war, a decision upheld by the Fifth Circuit, sending the case back to state courts.

A state jury trial in the case was held through March and April 2025, with Plaquemines Parish seeking up to $3 billion in damages from Chevron. After four weeks, the jury found for the parish, and issued a $745 million penalty against Chevron.

== Supreme Court ==
Chevron petitioned directly to the Supreme Court following the jury's decision, not only arguing for their recent loss but the impact the jurisdiction ruling would have on the other forty-some cases raised by the parishes against other companies. The Supreme Court certified the case in June 2025.

Oral arguments were held on January 12, 2026. Days prior, justice Samuel Alito recused himself from the case as he had financial ties to ConocoPhillips, a party with Chevron on the suit.

The Court issued its decision on April 17, 2026, vacating the Fifth Circuit's ruling in an 8–0 decision. Justice Clarence Thomas wrote the majority, joined by all excluding Alito (recused) and Ketanji Brown Jackson, who wrote her own concurrence. Thomas wrote that Chevron had shown its activities were related to the wartime aviation fuel production mandate under federal contract, and that "Congress has long authorized federal officers and their agents to remove suits brought against them in state court to federal court." Thomas wrote that in language of the federal officer removal statute, "any officer (or any person acting under that officer) of the United States or of any agency thereof, in an official or individual capacity, for or relating to any act under color of such office.", the term "relating to" did apply to Chevron, and while that must "require[...] a connection that is not 'tenuous, remote, or peripheral'," the parishes' lawsuit had "implicate[d] acts by Chevron that are closely connected to the performance of its federal duties", thus allowing Chevron to request removal. Jackson in her concurrence said that the case could have been decided on a direct cause-and-effect relationship from Chevron's duties to the federal government and subsequent activities to argue for removal.

The decision is expected to impact the other lawsuits that have yet to be settled and are still pending, likely to be all transitioned to federal courts.
