= Green Flag Award =

International award for parks and green spaces

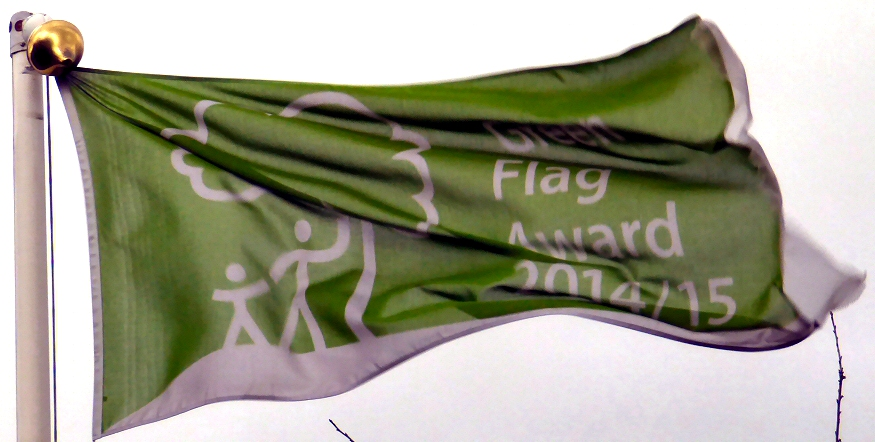
- Recognition of well managed open spaces
- Standards organization: Keep Britain Tidy; On behalf of MHCLG
- Effective region: Worldwide; primarily United Kingdom
- Effective since: 1996; 30 years ago
- Product category: Parks, publicly accessible spaces
- Type of standard: Industry
- Website: Green Flag Award

The Green Flag Award is an international accreditation given to publicly accessible parks and open spaces, managed under licence from the Department for Levelling Up, Housing and Communities, a UK Government department, by Keep Britain Tidy, which also administers the scheme in England.

== History ==
The Green Flag Award was introduced in 1996, and first awarded in 1997, by the Ministry of Housing, Communities and Local Government (MHCLG) with the intention of establishing agreed standards of good management, to help to justify and evaluate funding and to raise park attendance. The scheme was managed by Civic Trust, on MHCLG's behalf, until they lost the contract and the charity went bust in 2009.

The scheme has been managed by Keep Britain Tidy since 2012, with sister organisations Keep Scotland Beautiful, Keep Wales Tidy and TIDY Northern Ireland delivering the scheme across the UK, and various other bodies delivering worldwide.

== Purpose and description ==
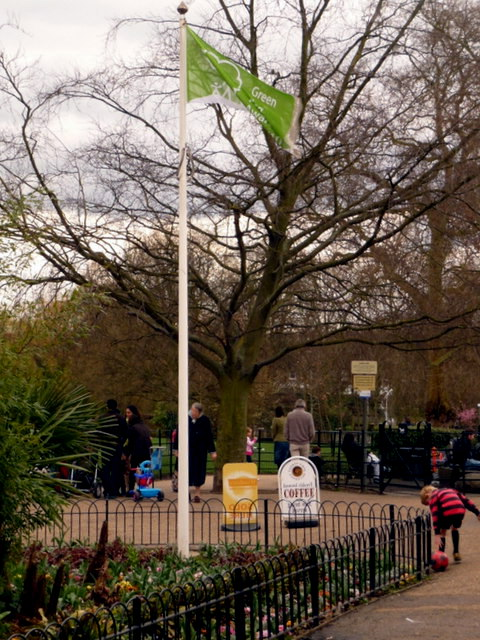
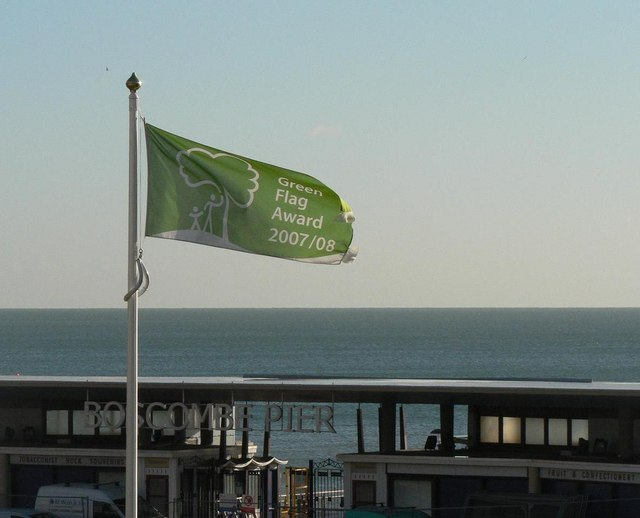
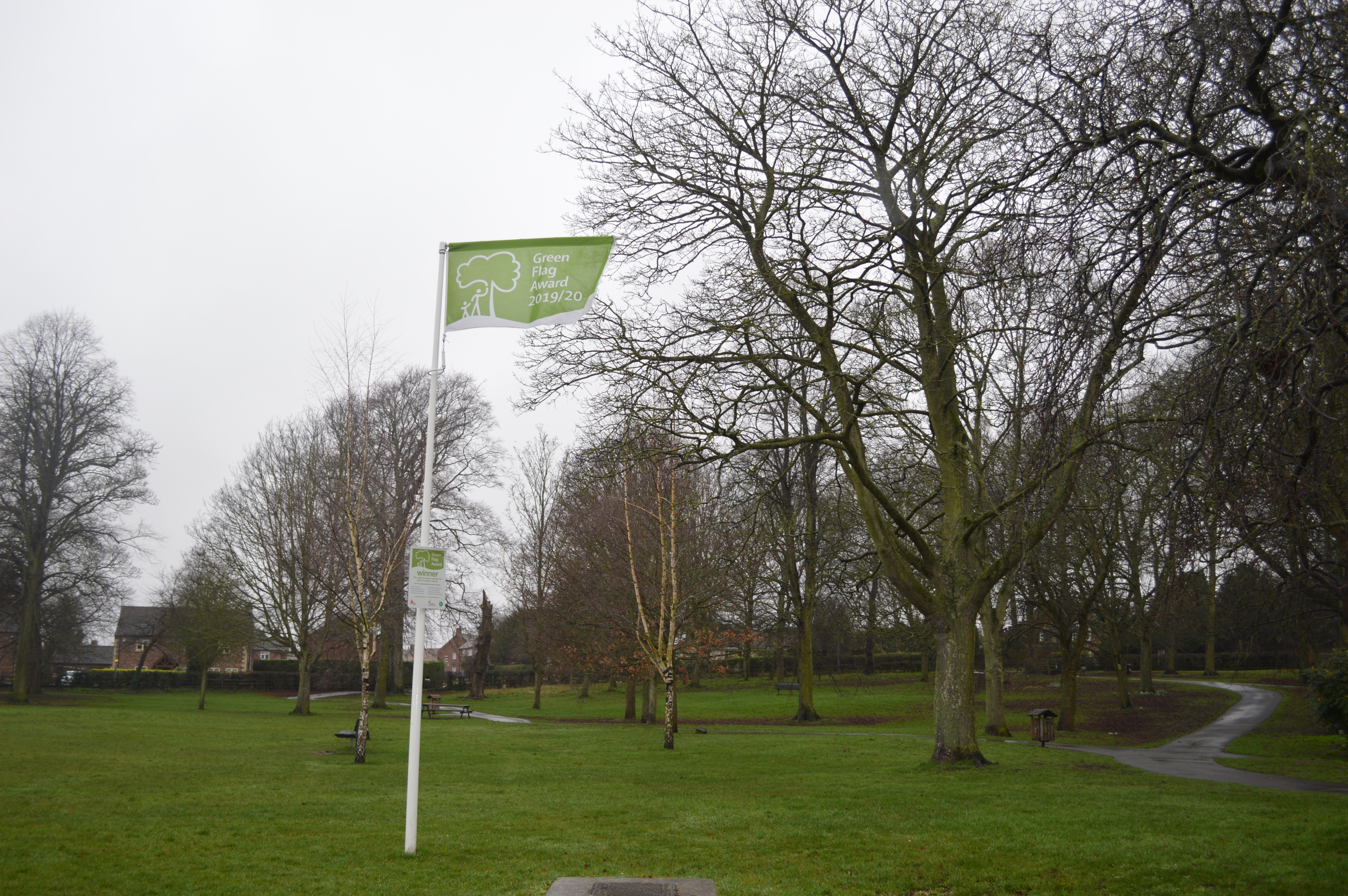
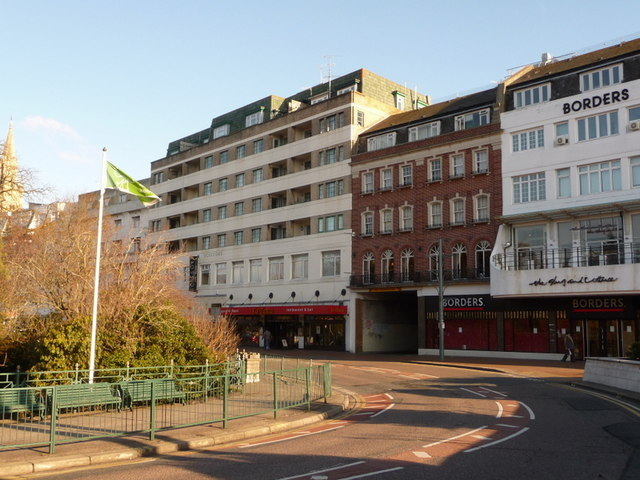
Green Flags on Display in Manor Park, London; Boscombe Chine Gardens, Dorset; Baysgarth Park, Lincolnshire; and Bournemouth Gardens, Dorset.

The scheme's aim is to promote standards of good management and best-practice amongst the green space sector. It is described by its issuers, Keep Britain Tidy, as an "internationally recognised award that is a benchmark for well-managed green space". As of October 2021, 2227 parks and open spaces held a Green Flag Award.

While public parks make up most of the awardees, the Green Flag Award is also issued to sites with different uses, such as Loughborough University and Bluewater Shopping Centre, for the management of their grounds.

== Governance ==
The Green Flag Award is managed under licence from the Department for Levelling Up, Housing and Communities, a UK Government department, by Keep Britain Tidy, which also administers the scheme in England, and several other countries, including Australia and the United States.

== Accreditation ==
The owners of spaces that wish to hold the accreditation, pay a fee to be assessed by volunteer judges on an annual basis with a process involving secret shoppers and inspection of both the park and the owner's management plans. The aspects that spaces are judged on are:

1. A Welcoming Place
2. Healthy, Safe and Secure
3. Well Maintained and Clean
4. Environmental Management
5. Biodiversity, Landscape and Heritage
6. Community Involvement
7. Marketing and Communication
8. Management

A failure to meet the judges' standards can result in the accreditation being withdrawn; one example of this is North London's Finsbury Park which lost its Green Flag in 2018.

== See also ==
- Blue Flag Award (for beaches)
- List of environmental awards
