= Litter =

Waste products disposed of incorrectly at an inappropriate location

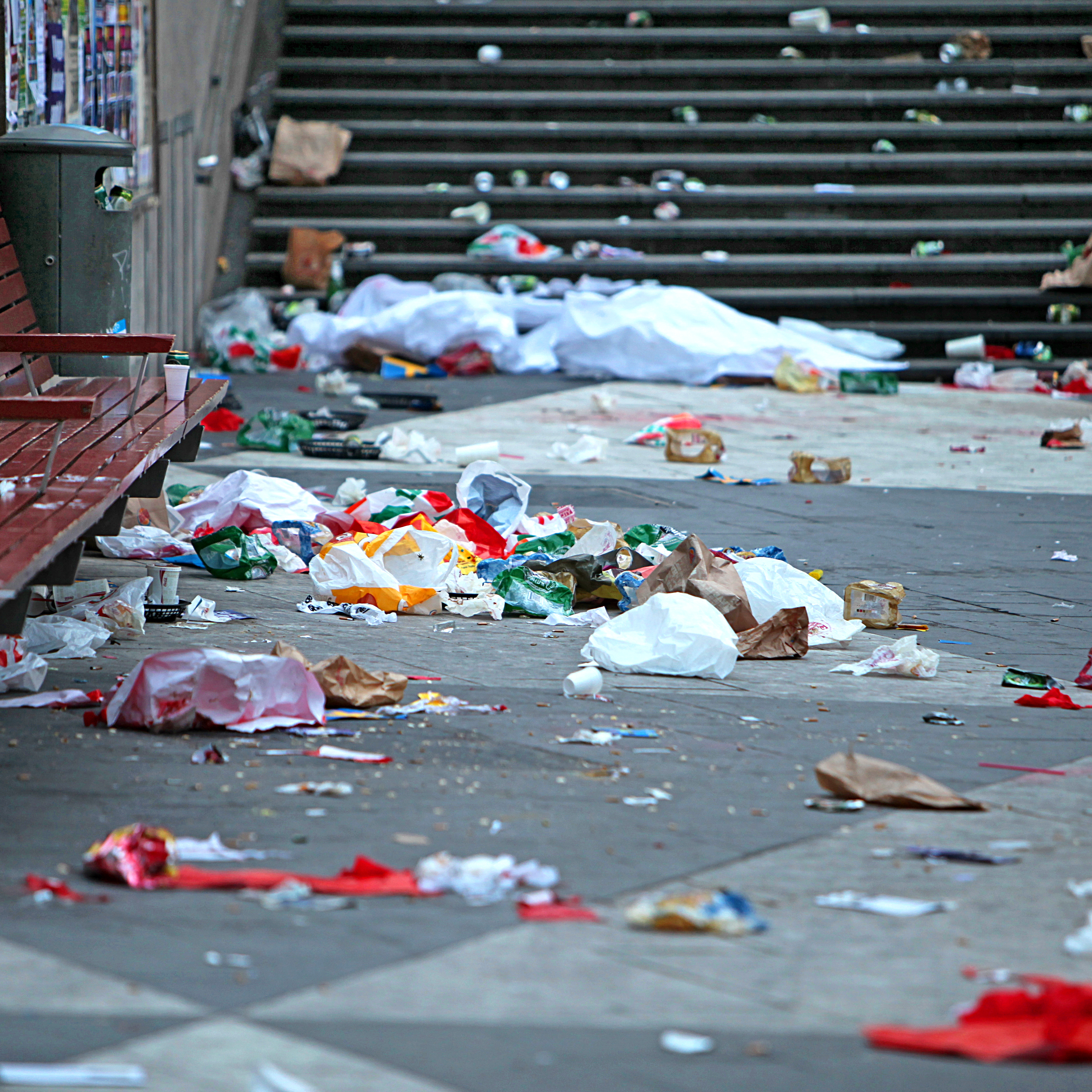
Litter in Stockholm, Sweden

Litter in New Orleans, Louisiana

Litter consists of waste products that have been discarded at an unsuitable location. The waste are objects, often man-made, such as aluminum cans, paper cups, food wrappers, cardboard boxes or plastic bottles, but also large and hazardous items of rubbish such as tires, electrical appliances, electronics, batteries and large industrial containers are sometimes dumped in isolated locations, such as national forests and other public lands.

Litter is a type of human impact on the environment and is a serious environmental problem in many countries. Litter can exist in the environment for long periods of time before decomposition and be transported over large distances into the world's oceans. Litter can negatively affect quality of life.

Cigarette butts are the most littered item in the world, with an estimated 4.5 trillion discarded each year. Estimates of the required time for cigarette butts to break down vary, ranging from 5 to 400 years for complete degradation.

== Causes ==
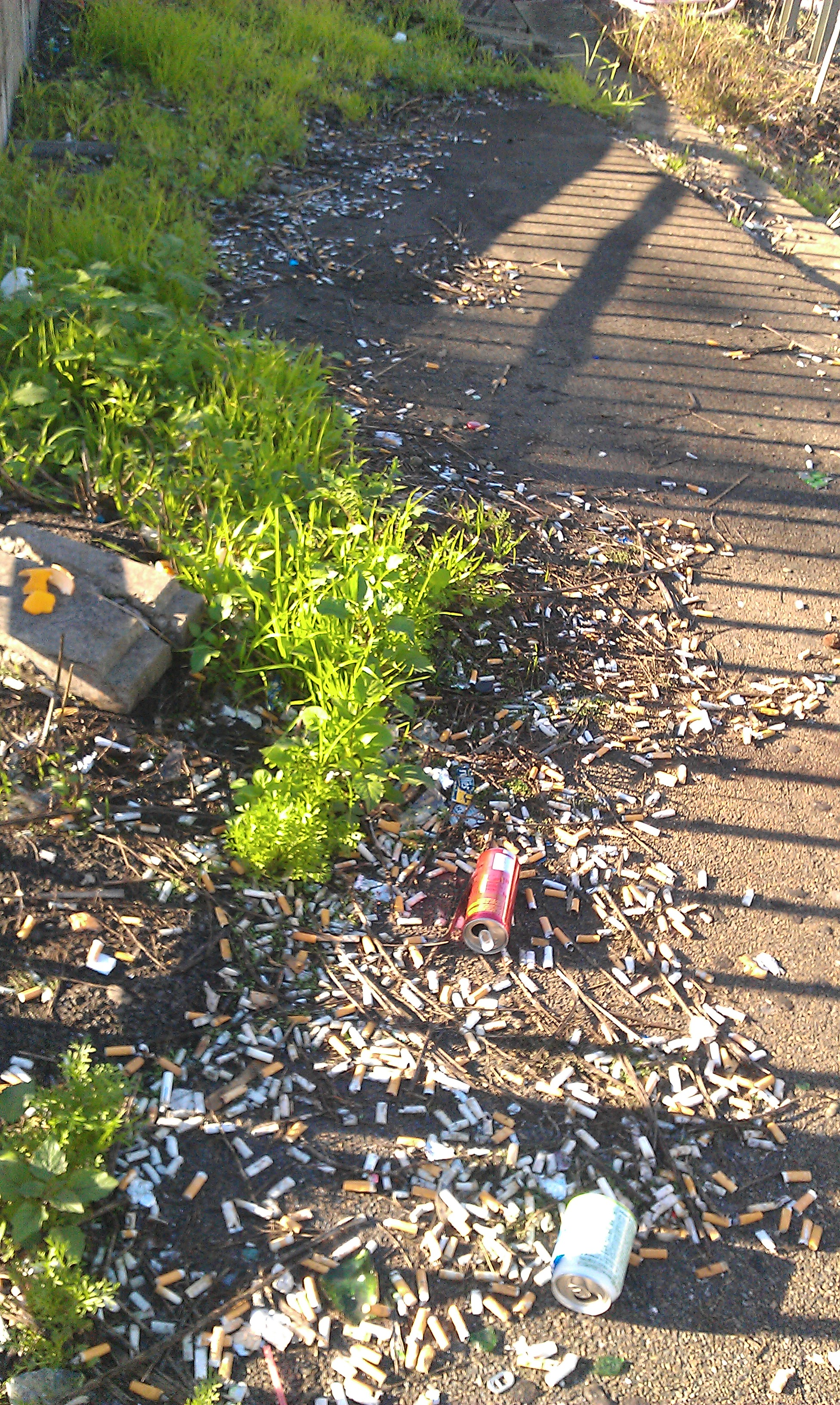
Platform of Strathfield station in Sydney, Australia. Rubbish accumulated over months, perhaps years due to unsustained periods of frequent cleaning.

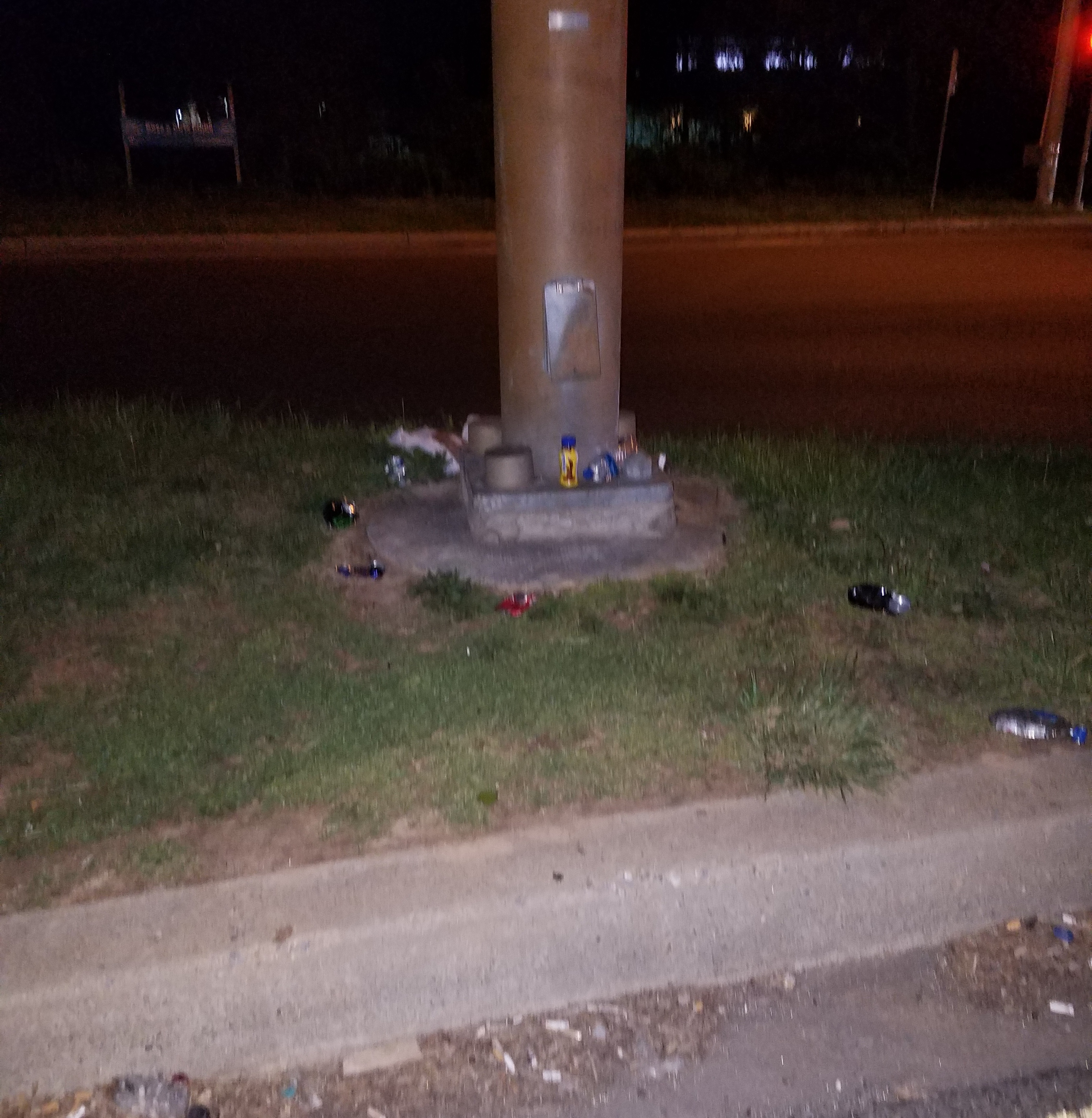
Rubbish on a street corner in Germantown, Maryland, left behind by panhandlers

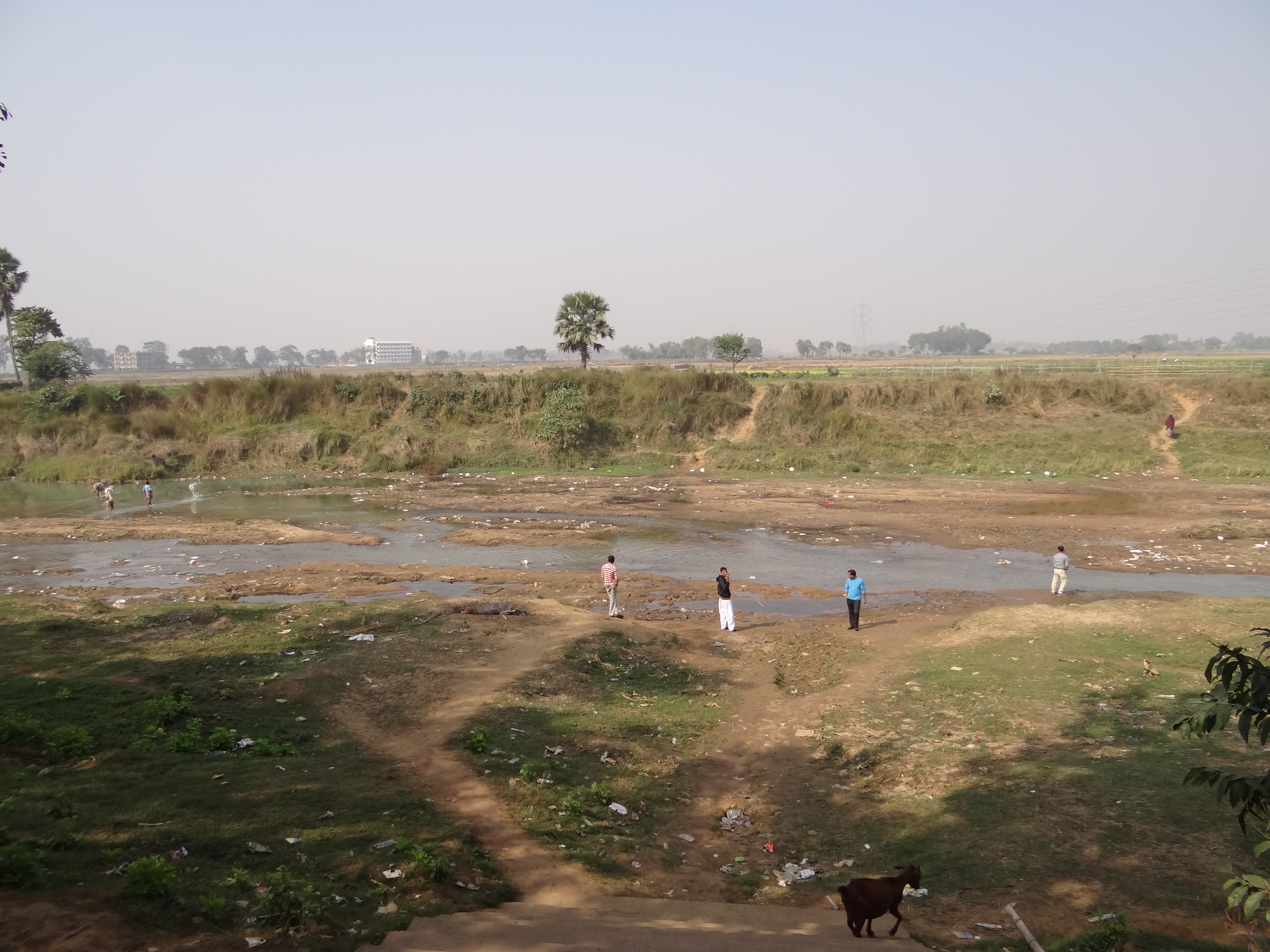
A small river's valley in India shows extensive littering of plastic and paper. Human waste, illustrated by the urinating man, increase fecal coliform and other bacteria levels in the water.

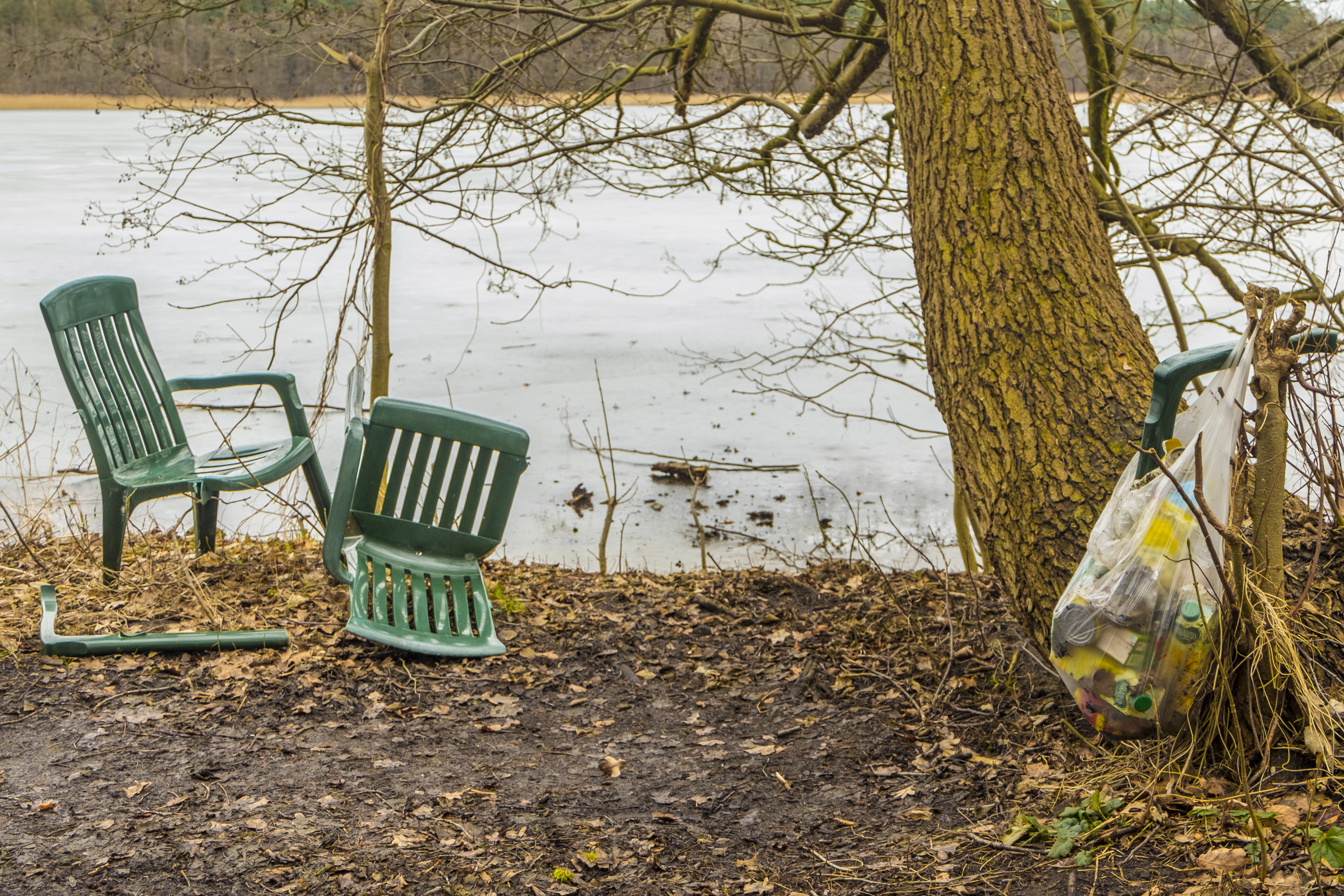
Littering in nature

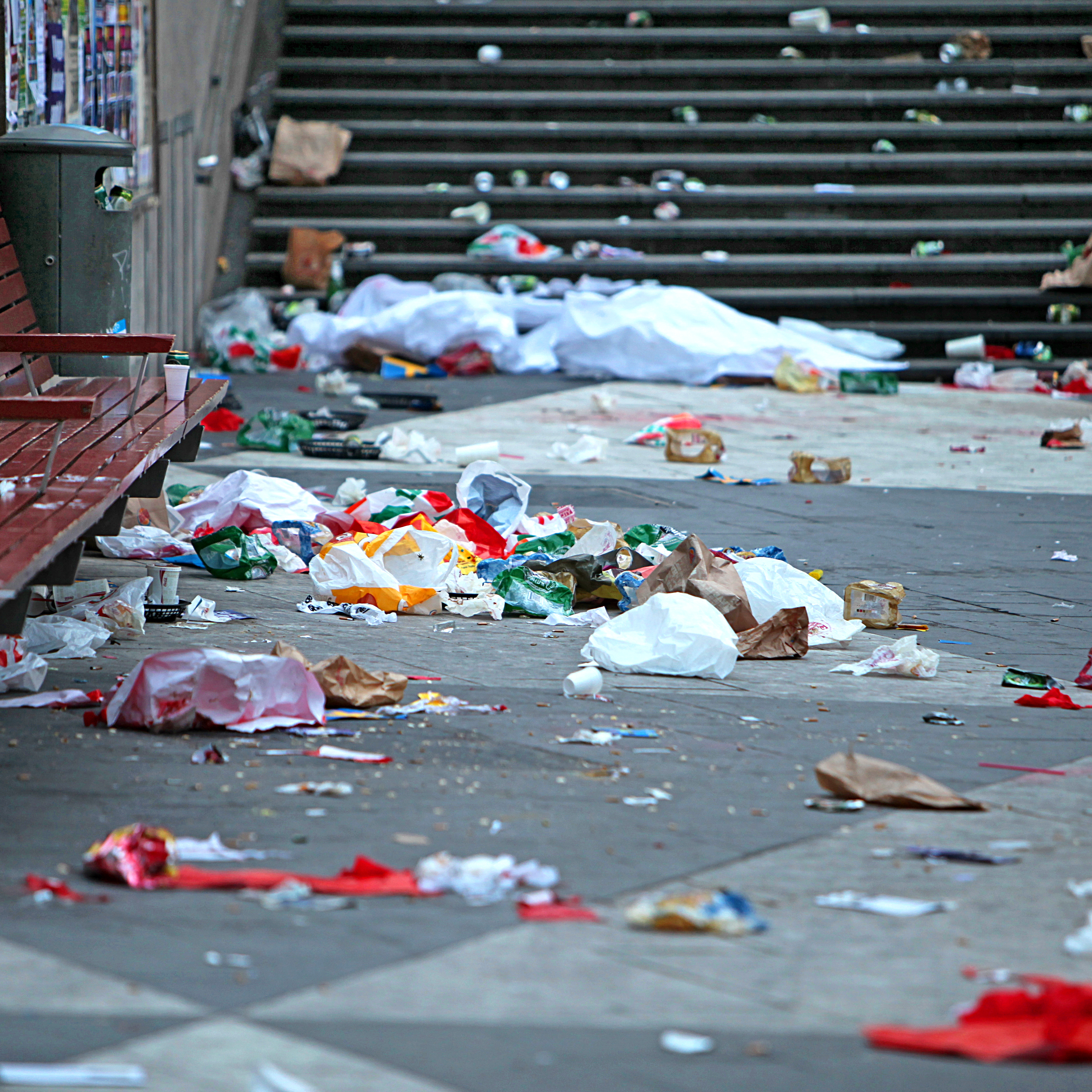
Litter on a street in Stockholm

Litter next to train tracks

In addition to intentional littering, almost half of litter on U.S. roadways is now accidental or unintentional litter, usually debris that falls off improperly secured trash, recycling collection vehicles and pickup trucks. Population levels, traffic density and proximity to waste disposal sites are factors known to correlate with higher litter rates.

Illegally dumped hazardous waste may be a response to the costs of dropping materials at designated sites: some of these charge a fee for depositing hazardous material. Lack of access to nearby facilities that accept hazardous waste may deter use. Additionally, ignorance of the laws that regulate the proper disposal of hazardous waste may cause improper disposal.

According to a study by the Dutch organization VROM, 80% of people claim that "everybody leaves a piece of paper, tin or something, on the street behind". Young people from 12 to 24 years cause more litter than the average (Dutch or Belgian) person; only 18% of people who regularly cause litter were 50 years of age or older. However, a 2010 survey of littering in Maine, New Hampshire and Vermont in the United States, placed litterers aged 55 and over at less than 5%. The same observational study estimated that 78% of litterers are male. Litter organizations, such as Keep America Beautiful affiliates, Keep Northern Ireland Beautiful, and the Bay Area Stormwater Management Agencies Association, have focused educational efforts on youth littering.

Negligent or lenient law enforcement contributes to littering behavior. Other causes are inconvenience, entitlement and economic conditions. A survey of dumping in Pennsylvania found that the largest number of illegal dumps were in townships without municipal trash hauling. The same report also cites unavailability of curbside trash and recycling service, shortage of enforcement, and habit as possible causes. The presence of litter invites more littering.

=== Two-stage process model ===
The two-stage process model of littering behavior describes the different ways in which people litter. The model was proposed by Chris Sibley and James Liu and differentiates between two types of littering: active and passive.

The theory has implications for understanding the different types of litter reduction interventions that will most effectively reduce littering in a given environment. The theory states that, all things being equal, passive littering will be more resistant to change because of two psychological processes: 1. diffusion of responsibility that increases as the latency between when an individual places litter in the environment and when they vacate the territory, and 2. forgetting, which is also more likely to occur at longer delays between when an individual places litter in the environment and when they vacate the territory.

== Life cycle ==
Litter can remain visible for extended periods of time before it eventually biodegrades, with some items made of condensed glass, styrofoam or plastic possibly remaining in the environment for over a million years.

About 18 percent of litter, usually traveling through stormwater systems, ends up in local streams, rivers, and waterways. Uncollected litter can accrete and flow into streams, local bays and estuaries. Litter in the ocean either washes up on beaches or collects in ocean gyres such as the Great Pacific Garbage Patch. About 80 percent of marine debris comes from land-based sources.

Some litter that is collected can be recycled; however, degraded litter cannot be recycled and eventually degrades to sludge, often toxic. The majority of litter that is collected goes to landfills.

== Effects ==
Litter can have a detrimental impact on humans and the environment in different ways.

=== Effects on humans ===
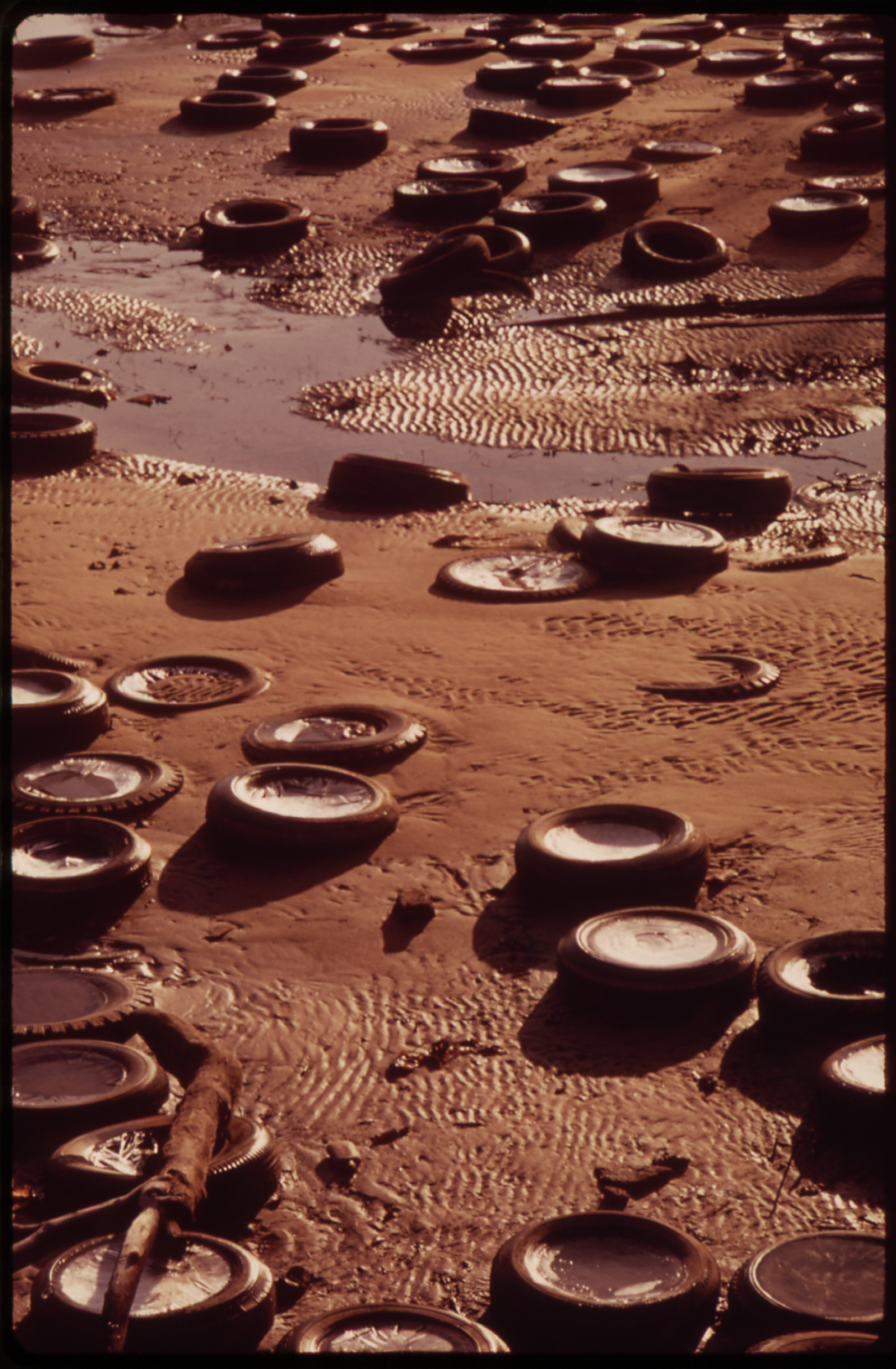
These car tires were discarded on the Middle Branch of Baltimore Harbor in this photo from 1973. Tire dumping is still a concern today and could be reduced by tire recycling.

Hazardous materials encapsulated within tires and other items of illegally dumped rubbish can leach into water sources, contaminate the soil and pollute the air.

Tires are the most often dumped hazardous waste. In 2007 the United States generated 262 million scrap tires. Thirty-eight states have laws that ban whole tires being deposited in landfills. Many of these discarded tires end up illegally dumped on public lands. Tires can become a breeding ground for insect vectors which can transmit disease to humans. Mosquitoes, which breed in stagnant water, can transmit West Nile virus and malaria. Rodents nest in accumulated tires and can transmit diseases such as Hantavirus.

When tires are burned, they can smolder for long periods of time, emitting hundreds of chemical compounds that pollute the air causing respiratory illnesses. Additionally the residue left behind can harm the soil and leach into groundwater.

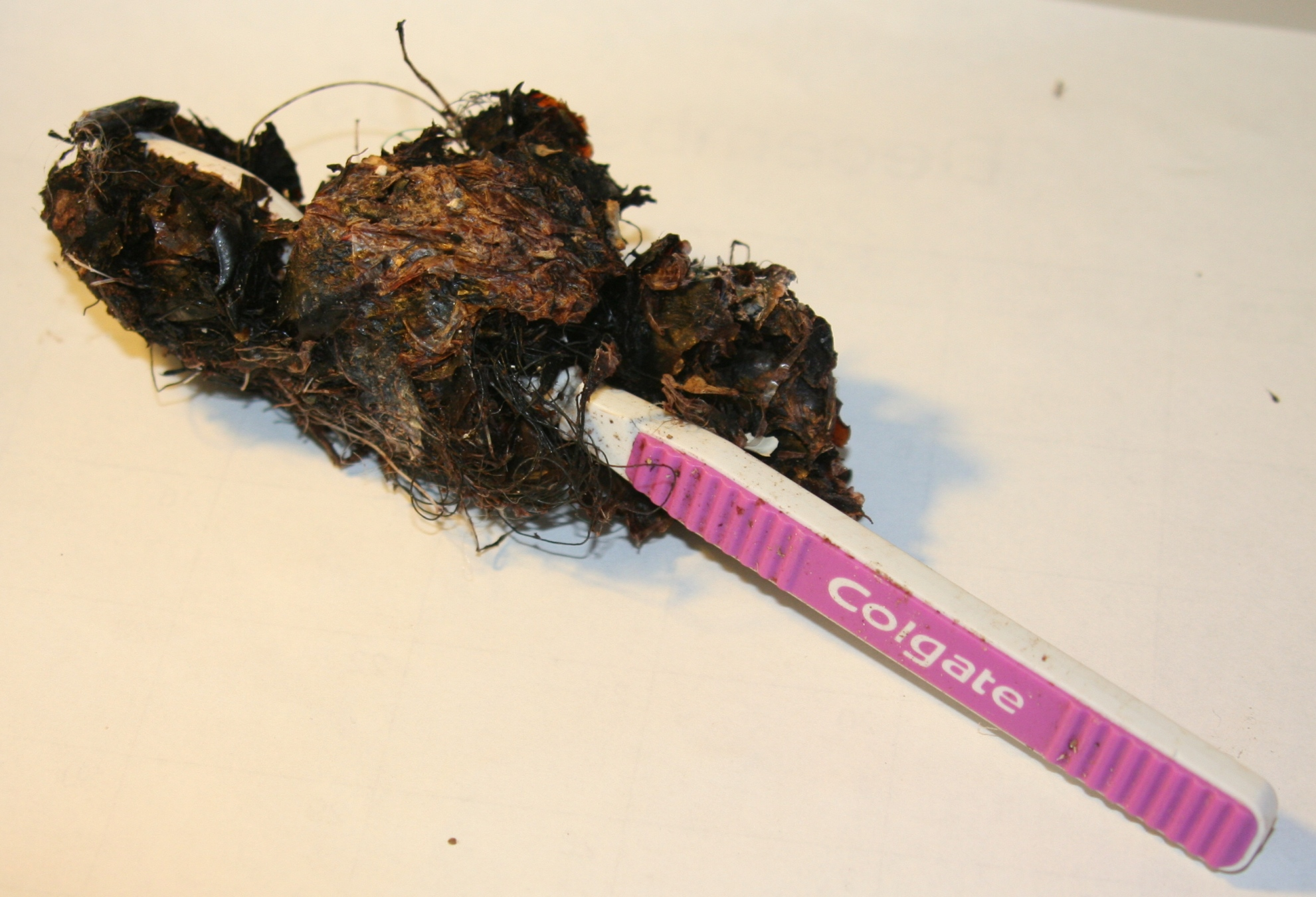
This bolus from a Hawaiian albatross (either a black-footed albatross or a Laysan albatross) has several ingested flotsam items, including monofilament from fishing nets and a discarded toothbrush. Ingestion of plastic flotsam can be an increasing health risk to albatrosses. Tern Island, French Frigate Shoals.

Visual pollution is a major effect of litter.

Open containers such as paper cups, cardboard food packets, plastic drink bottles and aluminum drinks cans get filled up with rainwater, providing breeding locations for mosquitoes. In addition, a spark or a lightning flash can start a fire if it strikes litter such as a paper bag or cardboard box.

Litter can be hazardous to health. Debris falling from vehicles is an increasing cause of automobile accidents. Discarded dangerous goods, chemicals, tires, sharps waste and pathogens resulting from litter can cause accidental harm to humans.

Litter also carries substantial cost to the economy. Cleaning up litter in the US costs hundreds of dollars per ton, about ten times more than the cost of trash disposal, with a cost totaling about $11 billion per year.

Litter is sometimes thrown from high-rise buildings; in addition to the usual harms of littering, this can be dangerous to people below.

=== Effects on wildlife ===
Animals may get trapped or poisoned with litter in their habitats. Cigarette butts and filters are a threat to wildlife and have been found in the stomachs of fish, birds and whales, who have mistaken them for food. Also, animals can get trapped in the rubbish and be in serious discomfort. For example, the plastic used to hold beverage cans together can get wrapped around animals' necks and cause them to suffocate as they grow. Other instances where animals could be harmed by litter include broken glass lacerating the paws of dogs, cats, and other small mammals.

=== Other effects ===
Organic litter in large amounts can cause water pollution and lead to algal blooms. Cigarettes could also start fires if they are not put out and then discarded in the environment.

== Extent ==
Litter is an environmental concern in many countries around the world. While countries in the developing world lack the resources to deal with the issue, consumer-based economies in the western world are capable of generating larger quantities of litter per capita due to a higher consumption of disposable products.

=== Branded litter ===
A number of credible studies have shown that fast food packaging is one of the most common forms of litter, while McDonald's is the most common brand of litter, despite having messages to dispose of it properly, such as the Ronald McDonald "tidy man" marking. According to Keep Britain Tidy in 2013, Cadbury chocolate wrappers, Walkers crisp packets and Coca-Cola cans were the three top brands that were the most common pieces of rubbish found in UK streets.

== Solutions ==
"No littering" sign as used in the U.S.

"No littering" sign as used in Europe

Unicode's "No littering sign" emoji

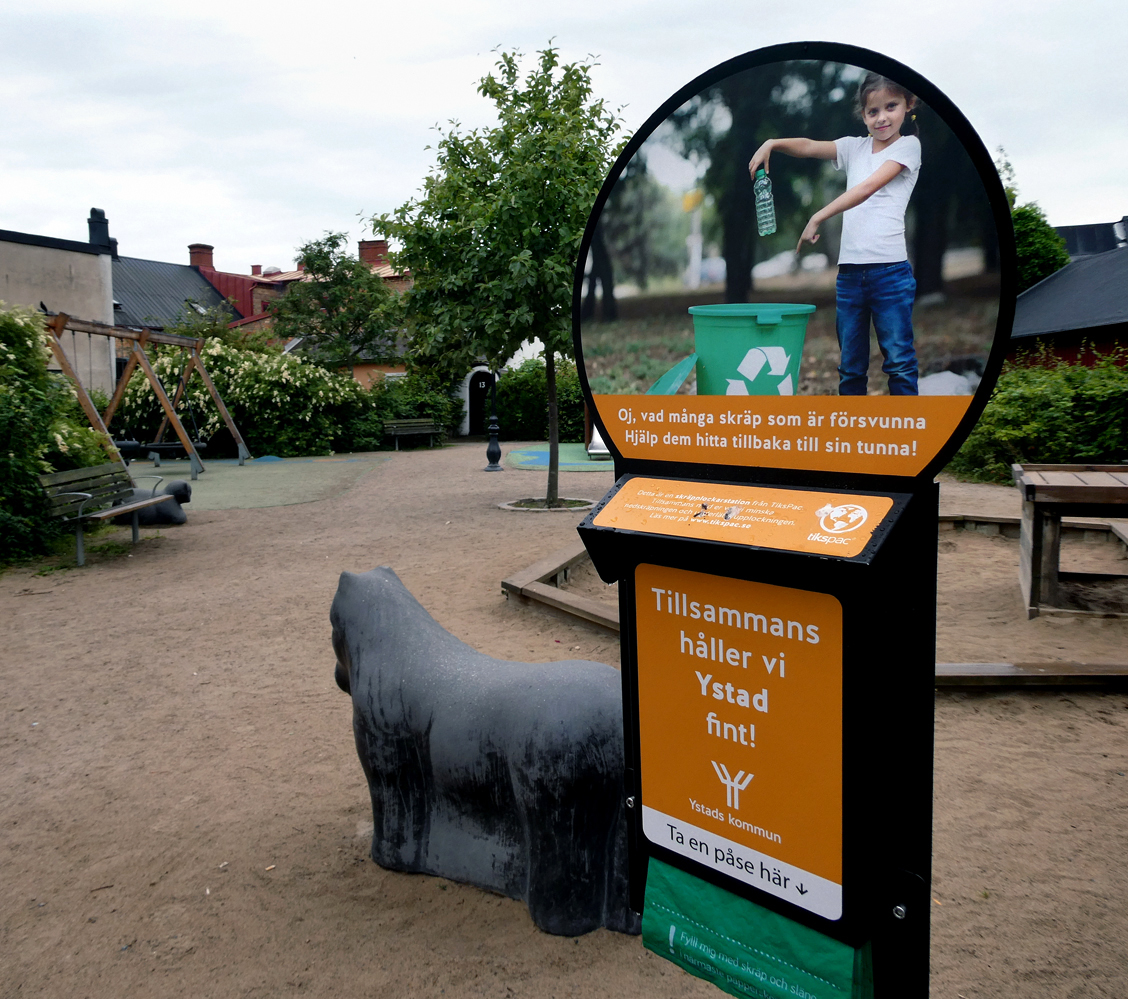
Holder for waste bags at a playground in central Ystad 2020, an initiative of the municipality to stop littering in public places

=== Cleanup ===
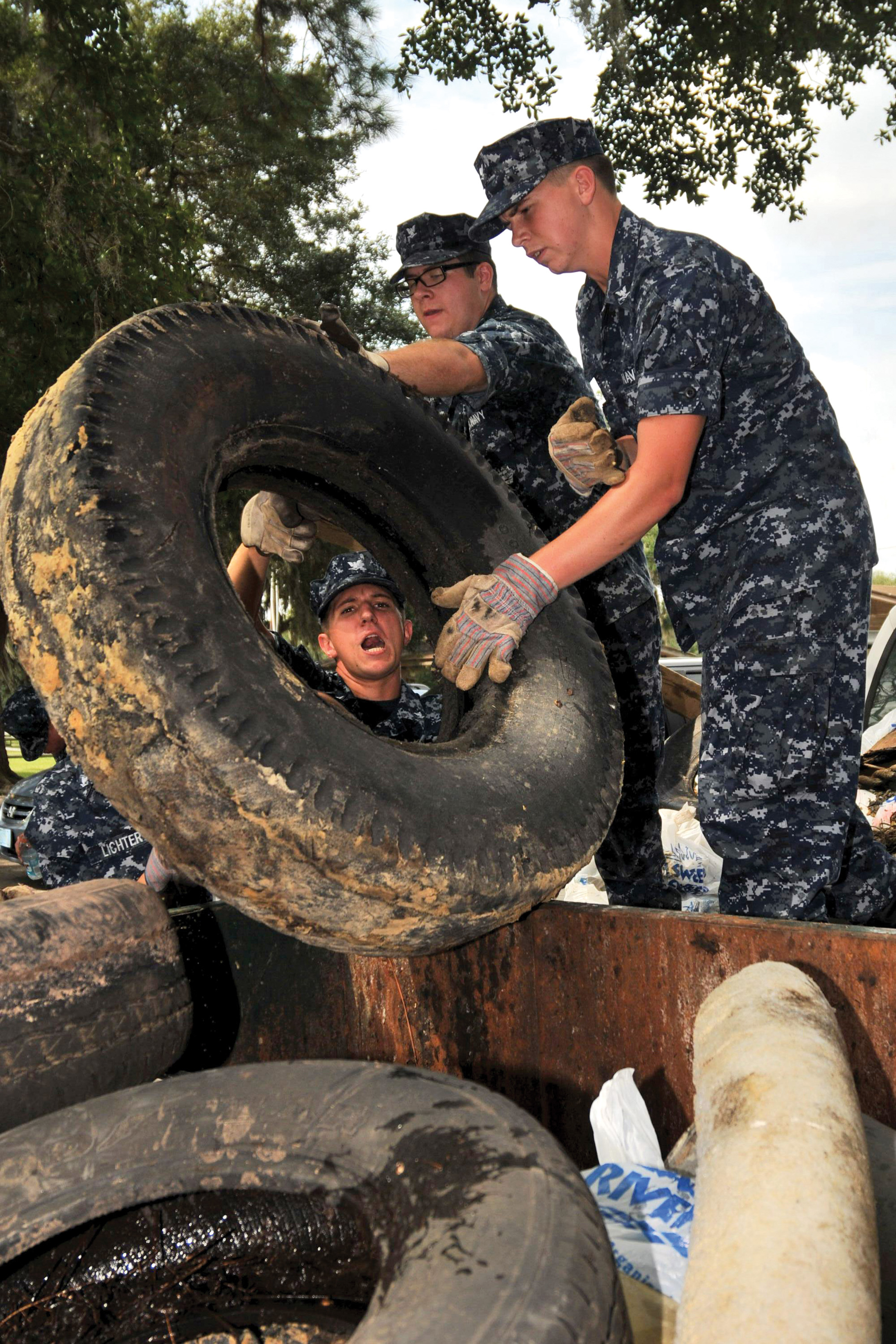
Navy sailors remove and dispose of used tires littering the waterways of a naval base in Charleston, South Carolina.

Volunteers, sometimes alone or coordinated through organizations, pick up litter and dispose of it. Clean up events may be organized in which participants will sometimes comb an area in a line to ensure that no litter is missed. Organizations may promote litter cleanup events and may also have separate media campaigns to prevent littering. In North America, Adopt a Highway programs are popular, in which companies and organizations commit to cleaning stretches of road. Keep America Beautiful has held litter cleanups called the Great America Cleanup since 1998 in over 20,000 communities nationwide. Earth Day cleanups have been held globally since 1970. In 2019, Earth Day Network partnered with Keep America Beautiful and National Cleanup Day for the inaugural nationwide Earth Day CleanUp. Cleanups were held in all 50 States, 5 US Territories, 5,300 sites and had more than 500,000 volunteers.

=== Litter traps ===
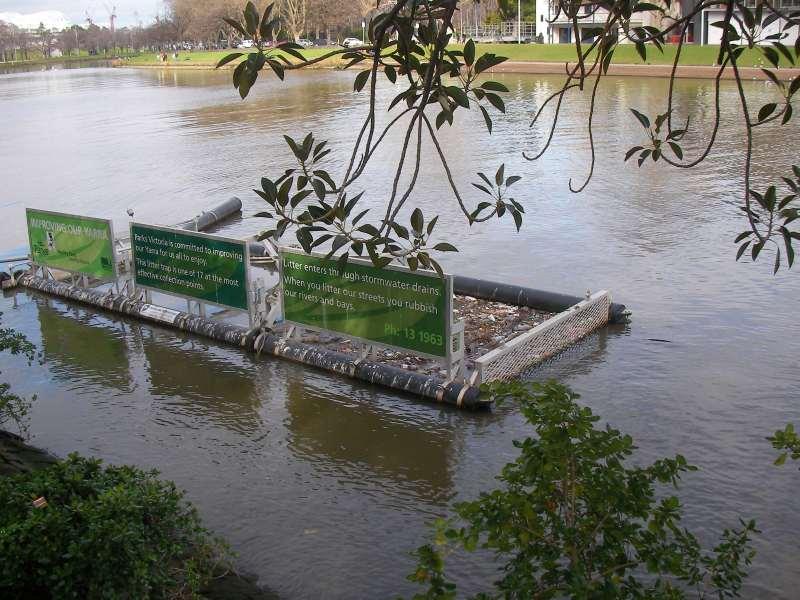
A Parks Victoria litter trap on the river to catch floating rubbish on the Yarra River at Birrarung Marr in Melbourne, Australia

Litter traps can be used to capture litter as it exits stormwater drains into waterways. However, litter traps are only effective for large or floating items of litter and must be maintained. A recent watershed litter survey showed a difference in the composition of street litter and stormwater litter.

=== Monitoring dumping sites ===
Increasingly, there have been efforts to use technology to monitor areas prone to dumping. In Japan, a study used Geographic Information Systems (GIS) to map areas of dumping based on site characteristics. Another study used satellite images to detect possible illegal dumping sites.

=== Container deposit legislation ===
Container deposit legislation can be aimed at both reducing littering and also encouraging picking up through local recycling programs that offer incentives, particularly for aluminium cans, glass bottles and plastic bottles. In New York, an expanded bottle bill that included plastic water bottles increased recycling rates and generated $120 million in revenue to the state General Fund from unclaimed deposits in 2010.

In some countries such as Germany and the Netherlands, container-deposit legislation has been introduced on cans and plastic bottles. Parts of Belgium are also considering adopting such legislation. People can thus collect refund value money from this type of waste. The result of this is that in Germany, hardly any cans or plastic bottles can still be found along the road. In the Netherlands, the amount of litter has dropped considerably since the new law was implemented, and 95% of the plastic bottles are now recycled. According to Chris Snick, the revenue that can be obtained from waste picking can be financially profitable in countries where container deposit legislation has been introduced: in 1 hour he managed to pick up 108 cans and 31 plastic bottles, earning him 13.90 euro (€0.10 per can/plastic bottle). By comparison, in countries where only the value of the aluminum for example would be refunded, 139 cans would yield only 1.72 euro (0.0124 euro per can; assuming there is 15 grams of aluminum in a can, and with scrap aluminum valued at 0.8267 euro/kg).

=== Fines ===
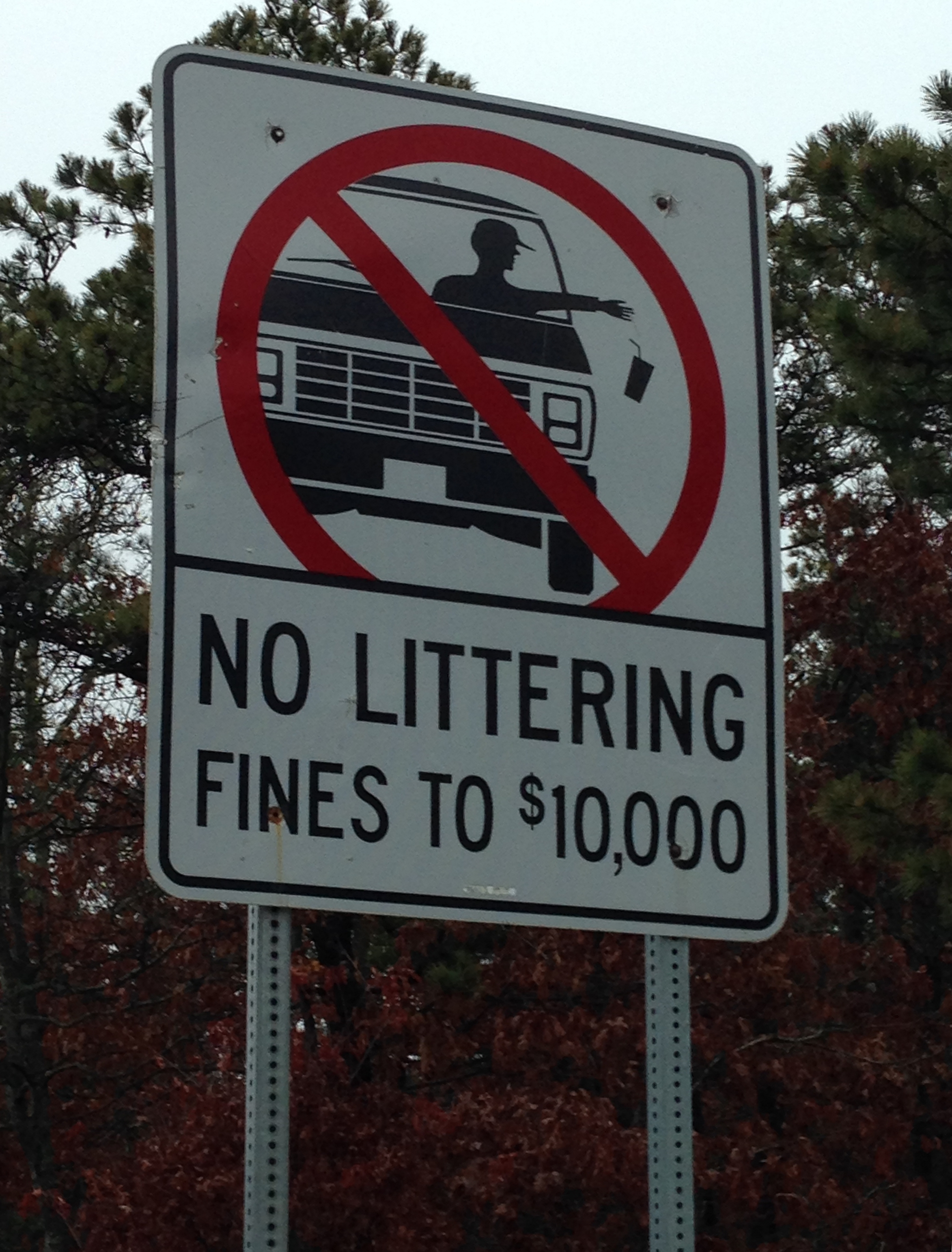
No littering sign at a highway in Cape Cod, Massachusetts

Some countries and local authorities have introduced legislation to address the problem.

Actions resulting in fines can include on-the-spot fines for individuals administered by authorised officers in public or on public transport or littering from a vehicle, in which the vehicle owner is fined – reported by either responsible officer or third party, sometimes online.

Specific legislation exists in the following jurisdictions:

- United States – punishable by a minimum fine of $200 and a maximum fine of $1,000 or even more in some states for a first offence, community service, or both, as set out by state statutes and city ordinances. All 50 states have anti-litter laws, with various fines, community service, and/or imprisonment as possible punishment.
- United Kingdom – Leaving litter is an offence under the Environmental Protection Act 1990. This was extended by the Clean Neighbourhoods and Environment Act 2005 under section 18. It carries a maximum penalty of £2500 upon conviction. However, many local authorities issue fixed penalty notices under section 88 of the Environmental Protection Act 1990. Often incorrectly known as "on the spot fines", they do not have to be issued on the spot. Nor are they a fine. If an alleged offender does not want to pay a fixed penalty notice, they can have the case heard in the Magistrates Court.
- Australia – no national legislation, although state based environmental protection authorities have laws and fines to discourage littering.
- The Netherlands – Dutch police and local supervisors (known as buitengewoon opsporingsambtenaar, or BOA) fine citizens for throwing away cans, bottles or wrappers on the street.
- Switzerland – dumping refuse and household waste inappropriately or illegally incurs a heavy fine.
- Hong Kong SAR – Littering in public is an offence under section 4(1) of the Public Cleansing and Prevention of Nuisances Regulation (Cap 132BK). It is punishable by a fine and 6 months' imprisonment.

== Gallery ==
No littering – road sign in Canada

No littering – road sign in Central America

Litter container - road sign in the United States

Litter container – road sign in Mexico

Garbage can – road sign in Central America

Litter bin – road sign in Cambodia

== Anti-litter campaigns ==
The International Tidy Man

Many groups exist with the aim of raising awareness and run campaigns including clean up events.

In the United States there are a number of organizations running anti-litter campaigns. Keep America Beautiful was founded in 1953, and promulgated the word litterbug, coined by its partner the Ad Council in 1947. At least 38 states have high profile, government-recognized slogan campaigns, including Don't Mess with Texas; Let's Pick It Up New York; Don't Trash California; Take Pride in Florida; Keep Iowa Beautiful.

In Australia, Clean Up Australia Day is supported by many major Australian companies, firms and volunteers alike. Anti-litter organizations include "Keep Australia Beautiful", founded in 1963. It created the popular "Do the Right Thing" campaign and its Tidy Towns competition became well known being a very competitive expression of civic pride.

Keep Britain Tidy is a British campaign run by the Keep Britain Tidy environmental charity, which is part funded by the UK government.

== History ==
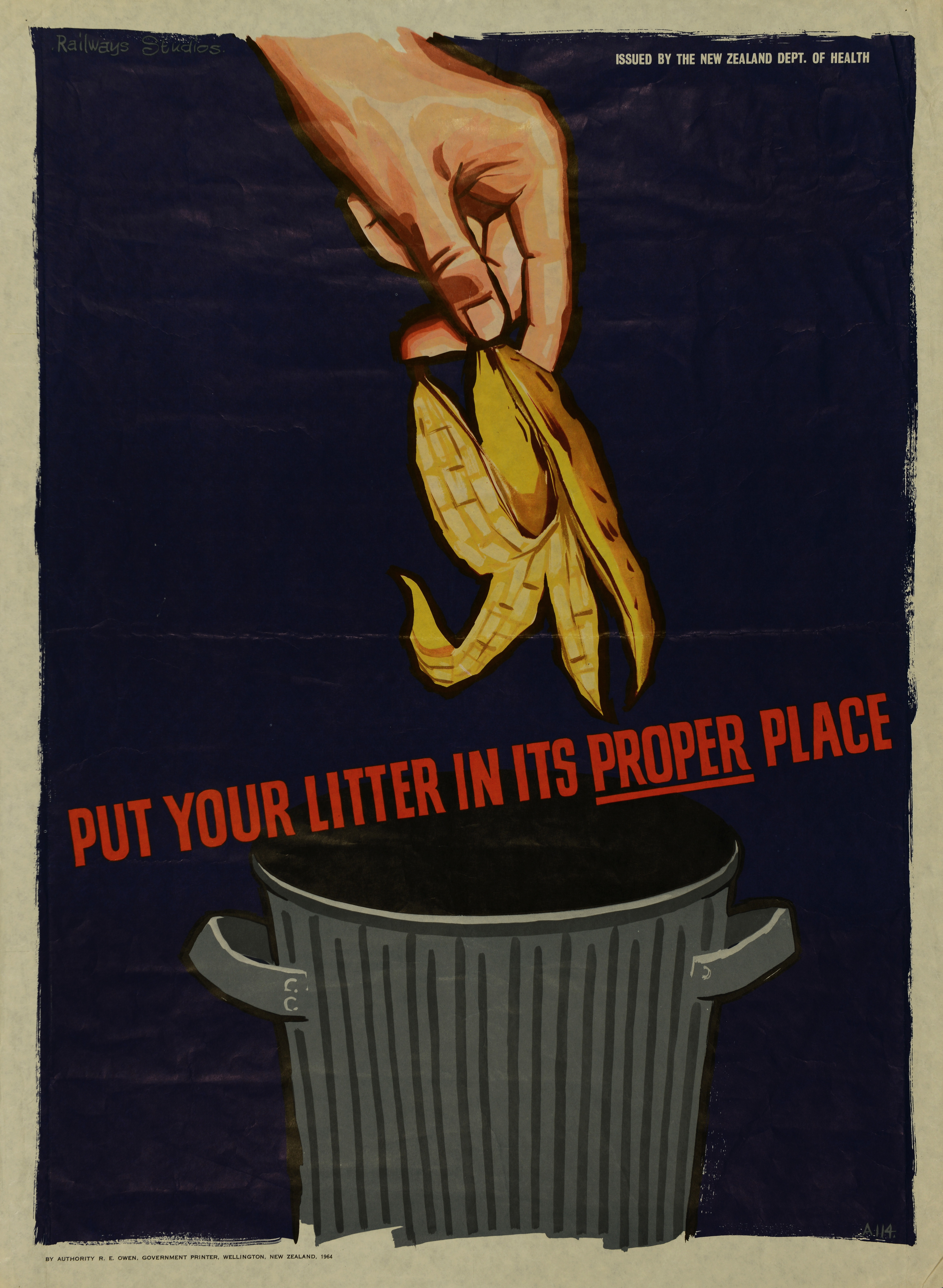
Littering prevention poster (New Zealand, 1964)

Throughout human history, people have disposed of unwanted materials onto streets, roadsides, in small local dumps or often in remote locations. Prior to reforms within cities in the mid-to-late 19th century, sanitation was not a government priority. The growing piles of waste led to the spread of disease.

Anti-littering legislation seems to have existed in ancient Greece, as is evidenced by a road marker discovered on the island of Paros, bearing the inscription "whoever drops their litter on the street owes 51 drachmae to whoever wishes to claim them".

To address the growing amount of waste generated in the United States, the Solid Waste Disposal Act of 1965 was enacted. In 1976 the Federal government amended the Solid Waste Disposal Act, creating the Resource Conservation and Recovery Act (RCRA), which requires a "cradle to grave" approach to the proper handling of potentially hazardous materials. RCRA gives authority to the Environmental Protection Agency (EPA) to regulate and enforce proper hazardous waste disposal.

Many countries now have laws that require that household hazardous waste be deposited in a special location rather than sent to landfills with regular refuse. Household hazardous waste includes paints and solvents, chemicals, light bulbs, fluorescent lights, spray cans, disposable batteries, and yard products such as fertilizers, pesticides, herbicides and insecticides. Additionally, medical waste generated at home is considered a hazardous waste and must be disposed of properly.

== See also ==
- Citizen Science, citizen cleanup projects
- Cleaning
- Earth Day
- Illegal dumping
- List of environmental issues
- Litter in Australia
- Litter in the Netherlands
- Litter in New Zealand
- Litter in the United Kingdom
- Litter in the United States
- Road debris
- Spitting
- SpoGomi
- Throwaway society
- World Cleanup Day
