= Keep America Beautiful =

Nonprofit organization

- Formation: 1953; Stamford, Connecticut
- Type: Private non-profit
- Legal status: Active
- Headquarters: 1010 Washington Blvd, Stamford, CT 06901
- Region served: United States of America
- President and CEO: Jennifer Lawson
- Website: kab.org

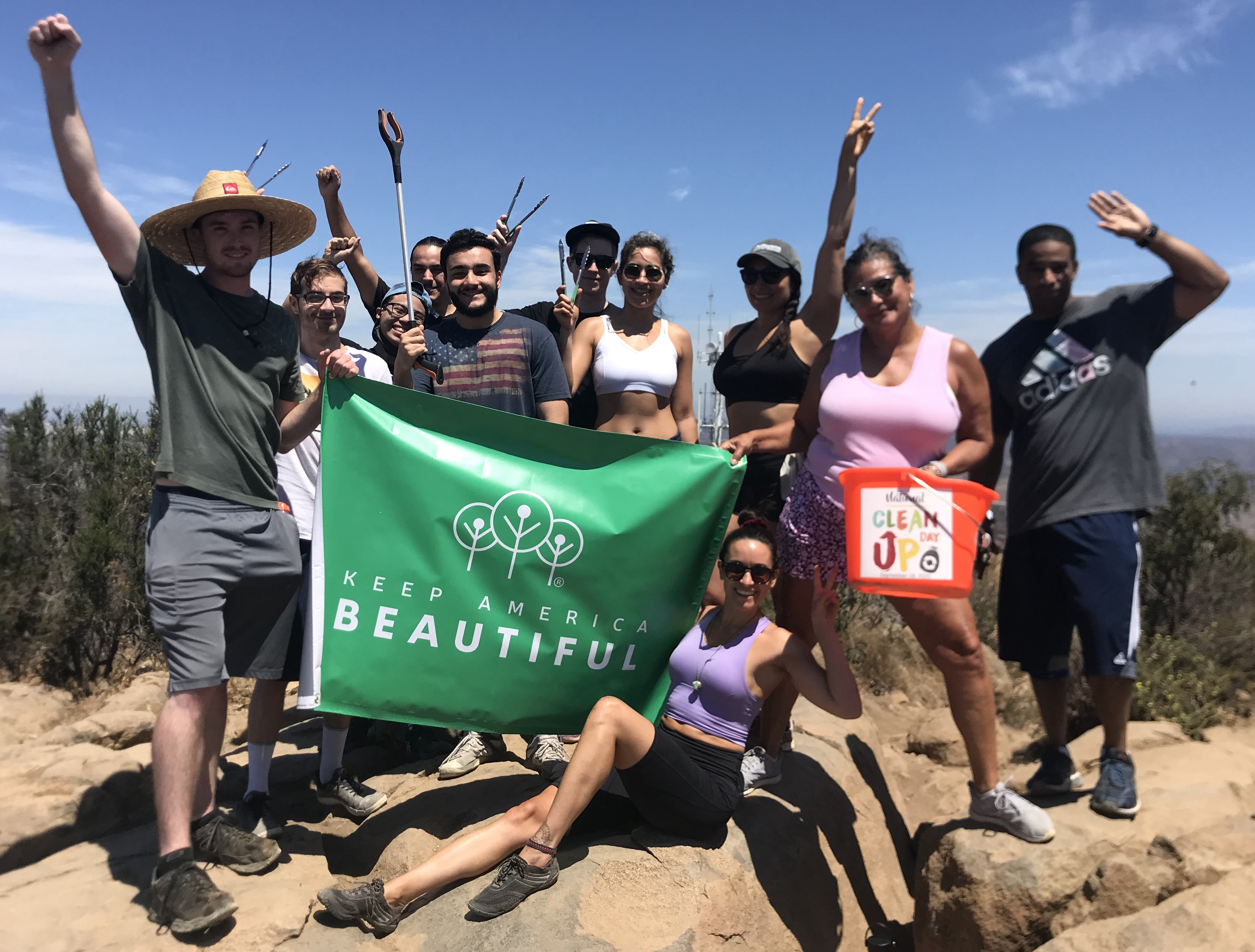
Keep America Beautiful cleanup volunteers in 2021

Keep America Beautiful is a nonprofit organization founded in 1953. It is the largest community improvement organization in the United States, with more than 700 state and community-based affiliate organizations and more than 1,000 partner organizations.

Keep America Beautiful aims to end littering, to improve recycling, and to beautify American communities. The organization's narrow focus on littering and recycling has been criticized as greenwashing in that it diverts responsibility away from corporations and industries.

== History ==
Keep America Beautiful was founded in December 1953 by the American Can Company and the Owens-Illinois Glass Company.

Keep America Beautiful conducted many local PSA campaigns early in its history. One of these early campaigns in Pennsylvania (PennDOT) some attribute to having coined the term "litterbug," although the National Council of State Garden Clubs representative exhibited a "litter bug" emblem at the first Keep America Beautiful organizational meeting. Author and Federated Garden Clubs of Maryland president Alice Rush McKeon published "The Litterbug Family" in 1931 containing poems and illustrations about the problem of roadside litter.

Keep America Beautiful joined with the Ad Council in 1961 to popularize the idea that individuals must help protect against the effects litter has on the environment. Paul B. Gioni came up with the 1963 television campaign theme "Every Litter Bit Hurts." Another campaign in 1964 featured the character Susan Spotless.

In 1970, Keep America Beautiful began distributing free brochures. More than 100,000 copies of the brochure were requested within four months.

In 1971, on Earth Day, a new campaign was launched with the theme "People Start Pollution. People Can Stop It." In what later became known as the "Crying Indian" PSA, the television ad, narrated by actor William Conrad with Peter Sarstedt's instrumental "Overture" playing in the background, featured Italian-American actor Iron Eyes Cody, who portrayed a Native American man devastated to see the destruction of Earth's natural beauty caused by the thoughtless pollution and litter of a modern society.

In 1976, Keep America Beautiful introduced its "Clean Community System", which encouraged local communities to prevent litter through education efforts, public service advertising, local research, the mapping of litter "hotspots", and cleanup activities. During the height of the campaign, it received over 2,000 letters a month from people wanting to join their local programs.

In 2023, Keep America Beautiful began its "Do Beautiful Things" podcast series hosted by Jenny Lawson, the organization's president and CEO. It covers policies, behaviors, and business solutions that can help create more sustainable communities. By featuring expert interviews and discussions it aims to educate and provide practical sustainability tips.

== Accomplishments ==
Keep America Beautiful is best known for its "Crying Indian" public service advertisement (PSA) which launched on Earth Day in 1971 and for its annual America Recycles Day.

In 2021, Keep America Beautiful released a comprehensive litter study. Its study concluded that 90% of Americans agree litter is a problem in their community, roadside litter is down 54% in the last ten years and there are approximately 50 billion pieces of litter on the ground in the United States. In concert with the study's release, Keep America Beautiful launched their hashtag #152AndYou on Earth Day representing that if all individuals picked up 152 pieces of litter, there would be no litter on the ground until someone littered again.

== Programs ==
=== Partnership with other organizations ===
Keep America Beautiful distributes programming and materials through a network of organizations. In addition to KAB's certified affiliates, the organization partners with other groups to expand its reach. These include multiple state recycling organizations, Boys & Girls Clubs of America, Hands on Network and the Points of Light Institute, the Arbor Day Foundation, Pennsylvania Horticultural Society, National CleanUp Day, Ocean Conservancy, Sustainable Urban Forests Coalition, EARTHDAY.ORG, and Take Pride in America, among others.

Scouting Keep America Beautiful Day was first cosponsored by Keep America Beautiful and the Boy Scouts of America in 1971 as a national cleanup and recycling program. Keep America Beautiful also co-sponsors the "Keep America Beautiful Hometown USA Award" with the Boy Scouts of America that boy scouts can earn by completing a non-paid, community service project, with the approved scout project being designed to "help keep America beautiful and benefit the community either physically or financially."

In January, 2021, Keep America Beautiful merged with RETREET, which focuses on post-disaster tree planting.

== Controversies ==
Keep America Beautiful's, now retired, 1971 ad campaign, featuring Italian-American actor Iron Eyes Cody as the "Crying Indian", has often been described as greenwashing.

Keep America Beautiful's actions have been criticized as greenwashing. The organization's narrow focus on littering and recycling diverts responsibility away from corporations and industries.

Despite self-identifying as having Native American ancestry with the stage name of Iron Eyes Cody, Espera Oscar DeCorti was of Italian descent. This sparked accusations of cultural appropriation and racial stereotyping. In February 2023, the Keep America Beautiful organization transferred ownership of the ad's copyright to the National Congress of American Indians, who intend to restrict use of the ad to only historical purposes.

Heather Rogers, creator of the 2005 documentary film Gone Tomorrow. The Hidden Life of Garbage and book of the same name, classifies Keep America Beautiful as one of the first greenwashing corporate fronts. She asserts that the group was created in response to Vermont's 1953 attempt to legislate a mandatory deposit to be paid at point of purchase on disposable beverage containers and banning the sale of beer in non-refillable bottles.

Keep America Beautiful's narrow focus on litter, and its characterization of litter as a consumer created problem, is seen as an attempt to divert an extended producer responsibility from the industries that manufacture and sell disposable products to consumers who improperly dispose of the non-returnable wrappers, filters, and beverage containers.

Elizabeth Royte, author of Garbage Land, describes Keep America Beautiful as a "masterful example of corporate greenwash", writing that in contrast to its anti-litter campaigns, it ignores the potential of recycling legislation and resists changes to packaging.

The tobacco industry developed programs with Keep America Beautiful that focused on cigarette litter solutions acceptable to the industry such as volunteer clean-ups and ashtrays, in lieu of smoking bans at parks and beaches. The tobacco industry has funded Keep America Beautiful and similar organizations internationally.

== See also ==
- Clean Up Australia
- Container deposit legislation
- Keep Britain Tidy
- Keep Northern Ireland Beautiful
- Litter in the United States
- National Cleanup Day (in the USA)
- Recycling in the United States
- Roads Beautifying Association (in the UK)
