= National Tidy Town Awards =

National Tidy Town Awards may refer to:

- Australian Tidy Town Awards
- Tidy Towns (Ireland)
- TIDY Northern Ireland
- Keep Wales Tidy

== See also ==
- Beatification
- Sanitation
- Social engagement
