= Litter in the United Kingdom =

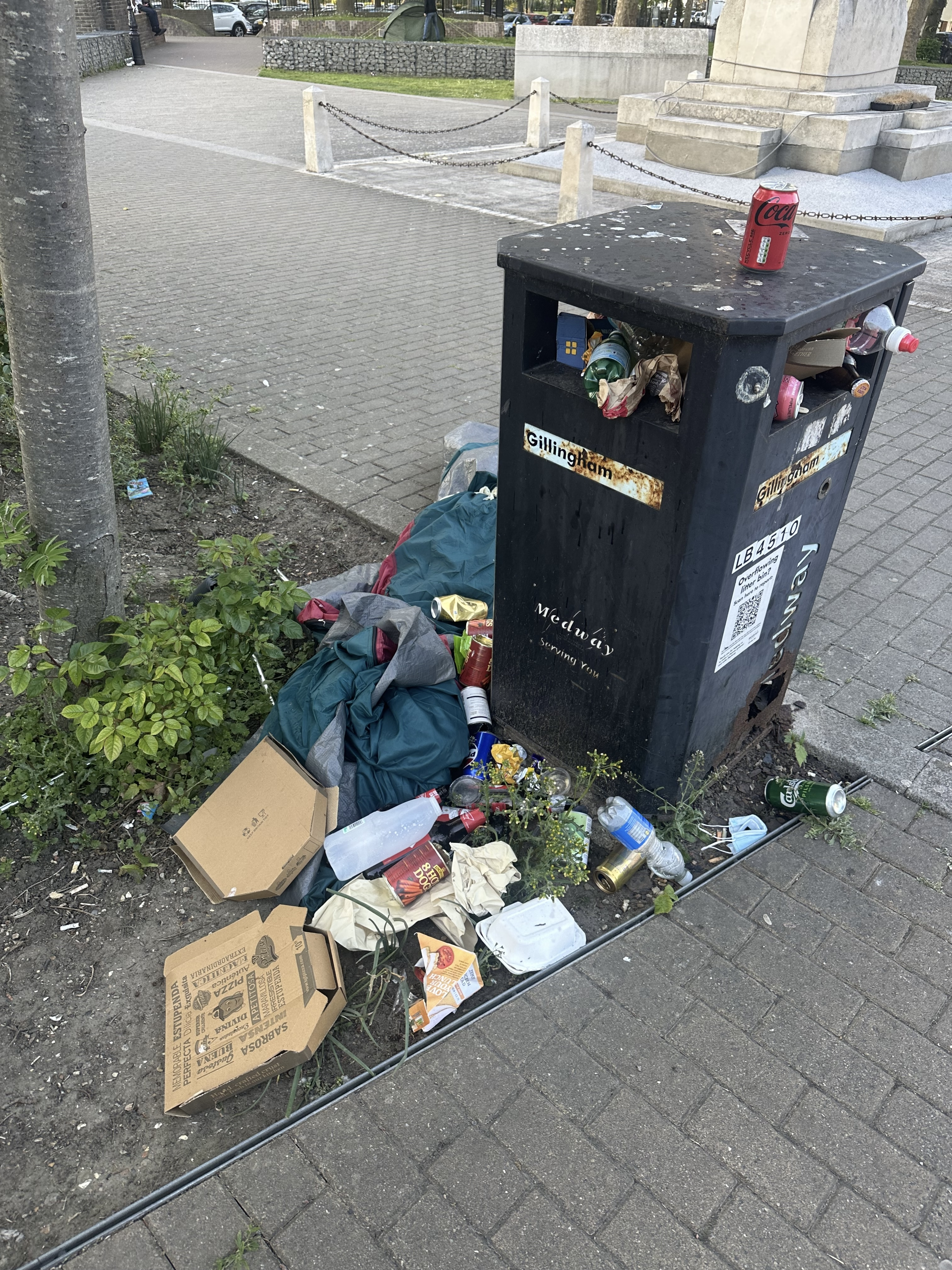
A public bin near the Gillingham War Memorial covered in extensive litter

In the United Kingdom there is a maximum fine of £2,500 for persistent littering. Different local authorities also have the powers to impose on-the-spot fines to those caught littering. These are generally under £100.

Cigarette butts constitute the majority of litter in terms of the number of items, but contribute to a small proportion of the overall litter volume. Small plastic bottles and non-alcoholic drink cans account for a significant portion of the litter volume, but are a smaller proportion of the item count.

== Legal ==
Cases are heard in the Magistrates' Court. Approximately 400 people in the UK were prosecuted in 2003 by the police for littering. Alternatively, in some areas offenders could receive an £80 fixed penalty fine for littering from the local authority litter warden. The offence of leaving litter (section 87 of the Environmental Protection Act 1990) says that if a person drops, throws deposits or leaves anything so as to cause defacement in a public place, they could be committing a littering offence. The same applies to litter thrown from cars. Police officers or litter wardens are empowered and trained to deal with offenders. It is also possible for the public to report information about littering incidents to the police, the local authority or a litter warden, who would then decide whether or not they wish to proceed any further. Whilst it is possible to take out a private prosecution, it would be at a person's own expense, and strong evidence would be needed in court to secure a conviction.

In 2018, data released through Freedom of Information requests showed that fewer than half of all fixed penalty notices issued by Scottish councils were paid.

== Campaigns ==
Keep Britain Tidy is a campaign run by the Keep Britain Tidy environmental charity.

The Royal Mail rubber bands, used during mail delivery, have been the topic of recurring media focus.

== See also ==
- Environmental issues in the United Kingdom
- Recycling
- Waste container
