= Keep Scotland Beautiful =

Scottish environmental charity

Keep Scotland Beautiful is an environmental charity based in Scotland, which aims to inspire action to combat climate change, tackle litter and waste, and restore nature and biodiversity.

== History ==
Keep Scotland Beautiful was founded as an independent Scottish charity in 2000, bringing together several environmental initiatives, including Local Environmental Audit Monitoring services, Waste Aware Scotland, Eco-Schools Scotland, People and Places Programme, Scotland's Beach Awards and Beautiful Scotland.

The organisation’s origins lie in the 1960s, with the "Beautiful Scotland in Bloom" and "Keep Scotland Tidy" campaigns run by the Scottish Tourist Board and the Scottish Women's Rural Institute. After this, under the auspices of Keep Britain Tidy, its focus in Scotland included educating young people about the environment through the international Eco-Schools programme.

== Timeline ==
=== 2000s ===
- 2000: Keep Scotland Beautiful is founded.
- 2002: The charity launches "Have Some Pride", a campaign aimed at reducing litter by encouraging people to take pride in their local area.
- 2003: The charity's Local Environmental Audit and Management System (LEAMS) becomes a national benchmarking tool for local authorities to audit the quality and cleanliness of their local environments.
- 2004: Along with the Scottish government and SEPA, Keep Scotland Beautiful launches the national fly-tipping campaign Dumb Dumpers, voiced by Richard Wilson. A second campaign was later made, voiced by Ford Kiernan and Greg Hemphill.
- 2005: Former chief executive John Summers is awarded an OBE for services to the environment.
- 2008: Keep Scotland Beautiful takes on management of the Scottish government's Climate Challenge Fund, providing funding for community projects taking action on climate change.
- 2008: Scotland's first "Litter Summit" is hosted by the charity, attended by MSPs and members of the Scottish government. One of the outcomes was to investigate a deposit return system for Scotland.
- 2008: In partnership with the Royal Horticultural Society, the charity launches "It's Your Neighbourhood", a community initiative aimed at helping gardening groups make improvements to their local environments.

=== 2010s ===
- 2010: Keep Scotland Beautiful presents the 1000th first-time Green Flag for Eco-Schools Scotland, celebrating the work of young people to protect the environment.
- 2012: The charity's flagship Clean Up Scotland campaign is launched at the Scottish parliament.
- 2013: Keep Scotland Beautiful awards its first Green Flags for parks, intended to recognise well-kept green spaces.
- 2014: The organisation creates Scotland's first National Award for Environmental Excellence, allowing organisations to benchmark their environmental performance.
- 2015: Following the launch of the One Planet Picnic initiative the previous year, the charity launches their national Pocket Garden design competition for schools in Scotland.
- 2016: The charity publishes a report revealing growing levels of litter, dog fouling and other antisocial environmental behaviours across Scotland. An update report was published in October 2017, detailing how these trends had developed over the preceding year.
- 2016: The charity launches its "Give Your Litter a Lift" campaign to tackle litter along Scotland's roadsides.
- 2018: Keep Scotland Beautiful becomes the first Climate Literate organisation in Scotland, as recognised by The Carbon Literacy Project.
- 2018: The charity launches several behaviour change campaigns aimed at tackling unsustainable consumption and its effects: Upstream Battle, My Beach Your Beach and Cup Movement.
- 2019: The charity launches, with funding from the Scottish government, Climate Ready Classrooms, a programme aimed at secondary school pupils and teachers to help them understand climate change and the actions they can take to combat the climate crisis.

== See also ==
- Keep Britain Tidy
- Keep Northern Ireland Beautiful
- Keep Wales Tidy
- Scottish Environment Protection Agency
- Scottish Natural Heritage
