= Keep Britain Tidy =

British environmental charity

- Founded: 1960 (as registered charity)
- Type: Charitable organisation
- Registration no.: A company limited by guarantee registered in England and Wales number 3496361, Registered charity number: 1071737
- Location: Elizabeth House, The Pier, Wigan, WN3 4EX
- Region served: England
- Website: keepbritaintidy.org

Keep Britain Tidy is an independent environmental charity, campaigning to reduce litter, improve local places and prevent waste in England. It has offices in Wigan and London.

== History ==
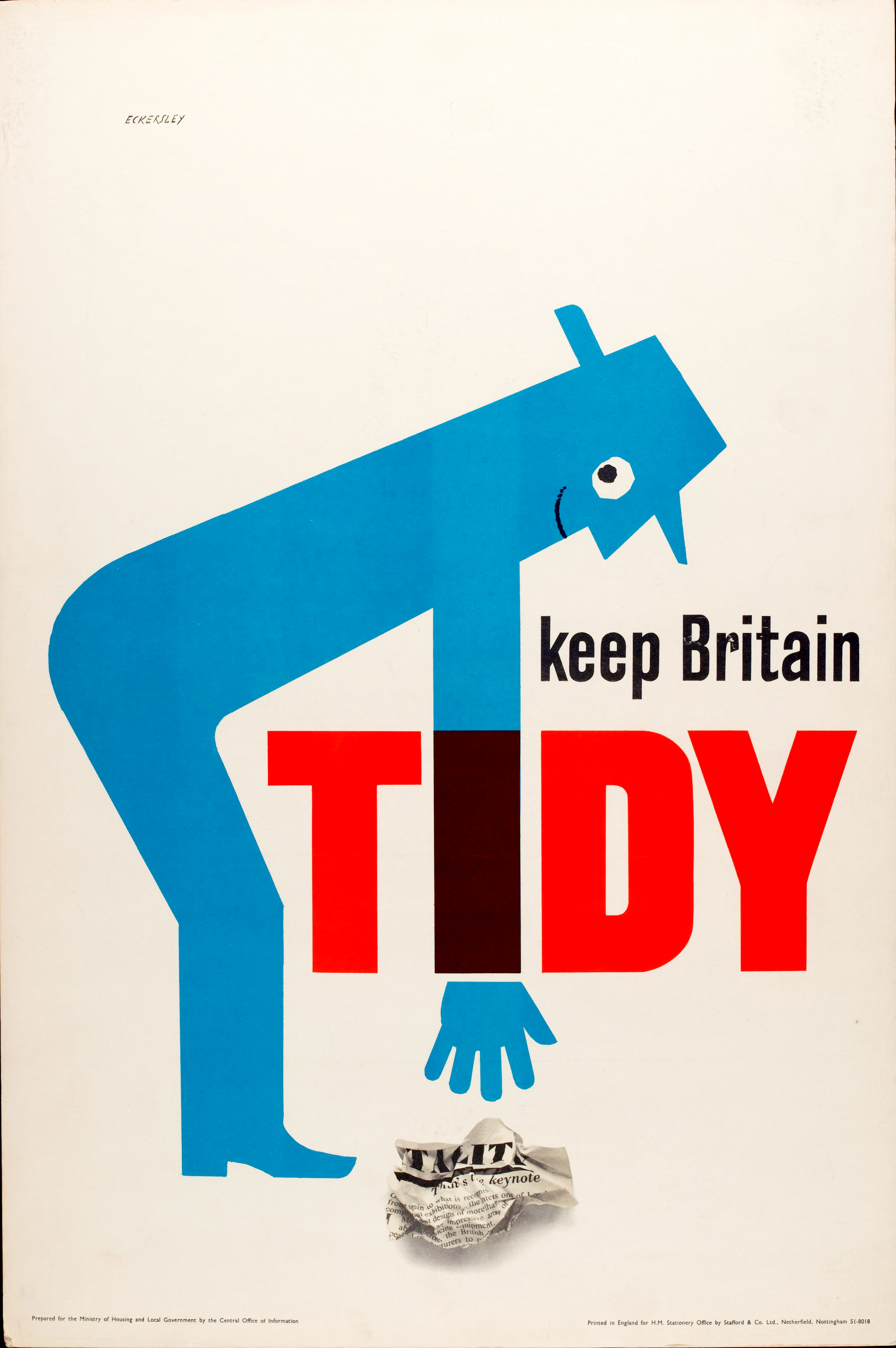
1963 poster

Keep Britain Tidy was originally set up by a conference of 26 organisations in 1955. The conference was initiated by the British Women's Institute after a resolution was passed at its 1954 AGM to start a national anti-litter campaign.

In 1987, Keep Britain Tidy changed its name to Tidy Britain Group.

In 2002, following a merger with environmental awareness charity Going for Green, the charity changed its name to ENCAMS – short for Environmental Campaigns.

The "tidyman" logo

In June 2009, the charity changed its name back to Keep Britain Tidy, introducing a new logo highlighting the IT within BRITAIN, reading "Keep It Tidy" as well as "Keep Britain Tidy". The "tidyman" logo is still used in public campaigns, alongside campaign straplines such as "Let's keep it tidy!" and "Help keep it tidy!"

Following a year-long strategic alliance, in 2011 Keep Britain Tidy merged with the environmental charity Waste Watch. Keep Britain Tidy became the trading name.

== Programmes ==
Keep Britain Tidy runs a number of programmes in England, including Eco-Schools, Seaside Awards, BeachCare, RiverCare, WatersideCare, LOVEmyBEACH, Keep Britain Tidy Network, Love Parks, Big Tidy Up, Green Flag Award for parks and green spaces and the Blue Flag Award for beaches. The organisation managed Keep Scotland Beautiful, Keep Wales Tidy and Tidy Northern Ireland until 2004, at which point they became independent devolved organisations. The Eco-Schools and Blue Flag programmes in Wales, Northern Ireland, and Scotland are now run independently by these devolved organisations.

== See also ==
- Clean Up Australia
- Keep America Beautiful
- National Cleanup Day
- National Tidy Town Awards
