= Waste Watch =

- Founded: 1987
- Type: Non-governmental organization
- Purpose: sustainability, Environmentalism, well-being
- Location: London, United Kingdom
- Method: Working from values, Business engagement, Community engagement, research
- Key people: Tim Burns, Head of Waste Watch
- Website: www.WasteWatch.org.uk

Waste Watch was a non-profit, sustainability organisation based in the UK, inspiring people to live more and waste less. It was a registered charity.

Waste Watch aimed to improve well-being and the environment on a local and global level, by changing the way we live; such as the ways we produce, buy, use and dispose of things. The organisation primarily worked with community groups, businesses, schools and other not-for-profit organisations.

In 2011 Waste Watch merged with the environmental charity Keep Britain Tidy.

== History ==
Waste Watch grew out of the community recycling movement in the 1980s. The organisation was founded in 1987, by the National Council for Voluntary Organisations, with a mission to make waste issues mainstream and to encourage waste reduction, reuse and recycling.

=== Timeline ===
- 1987. Ran the UK’s first Recycling Week during the European Year of the Environment. During this time, it also published the first UK National Directory of Recycling Information.
- 1991. Registered as a charity (no. 10054)(1337). During the 1990s, Waste Watch launched telephone information service Wasteline, produced the first UK Recycled Products Guide and lobbied UK government to introduce the first waste strategy for England.
- 1994. Launched Recycler the rapping robot to deliver the ‘reduce, reuse, recycle’ message to British primary school children.
- 1999. Commissioned the first UK-wide survey of public attitudes to waste which shaped the development of future national and local awareness campaigns.
- 2000. Became a founding member of the UK government-funded Waste and Resources Action Programme (WRAP), whose mission is to help develop markets for material resources that would otherwise have become waste.
- 2011. Merger with the UK environmental charity Keep Britain Tidy.

During the 2000s, Waste Watch ran Rethink Rubbish, which later became the national Recycle Now public awareness campaign.

== Recycler the Robot ==
In 1994, Waste Watch launched Recycler the rapping robot to deliver the ‘reduce, reuse, recycle’ message to British primary school children. The Recycler show involves story-telling with theatrical props and quizzes, and follow-up activities for the school. Along with an education professional, the robot shows pupils how they can put reducing, reusing and recycling into practice at home and at school.

Recycler has reached more than 1.5 million pupils since 1994, and has visited more than 7,200 schools, performing more than 15,000 times.
