= Litter in the Netherlands =

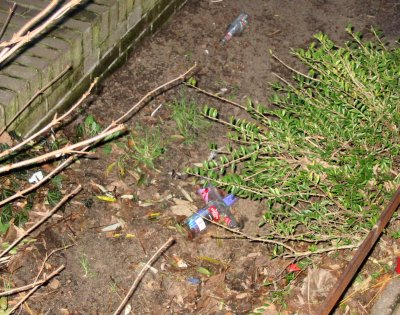
Litter, Mient, Den Haag, December 2003

In the Netherlands, the County Board municipalities as well as Rijkswaterstaat play a role in cleaning up litter. The Dutch police and local supervisors (known as buitengewoon opsporingsambtenaar, or BOA) fine citizens for throwing away cans, bottles or wrappers onto the street. The standard fine is 90 euro, unless the defendant is between the ages of 12 and 16. In that case, the penalty is halved to 45 euro.

In 2003, Rijkswaterstaat spent around 8 million euros cleaning up litter along the main roads. The division of Rijkswaterstaat-IJsselmeergebied alone took about 900 tonnes per year of litter from the 125 kilometers of roads they manage.

To reduce the amount of litter, the Dutch government agreed to a covenant with the business organizations. The agreements in the covenant fall within the spirit of the producer responsibility. This means that producers and products on the market are (partly) responsible for these products in the waste stage. The agreement contains agreements between government and industry about reducing the amount of packaging waste and litter. At the end of 2002 the Department on the Environment, on behalf of the government, signed a treaty with business organizations and the Association of Dutch Municipalities (VNG).

The objectives of the Covenant on litter are:

- The business will ensure that by the year 2005 the quantity of cans and bottles in the litter has decreased by at least 80% (from 50 million in 2001).
- The industry is obliged to demonstrate their efforts so that the quantity of cans and bottles in the litter for 1 January 2005 decreased by at least 2/3 (from 50 million in 2001).
- The government, the VNG and all businesses shall ensure that through a joint effort, by the year 2005, the remaining litter is reduced by at least 45% compared to the year 2002.

== See also ==
- Dutch law
