= America Recycles Day =

National environmental observance

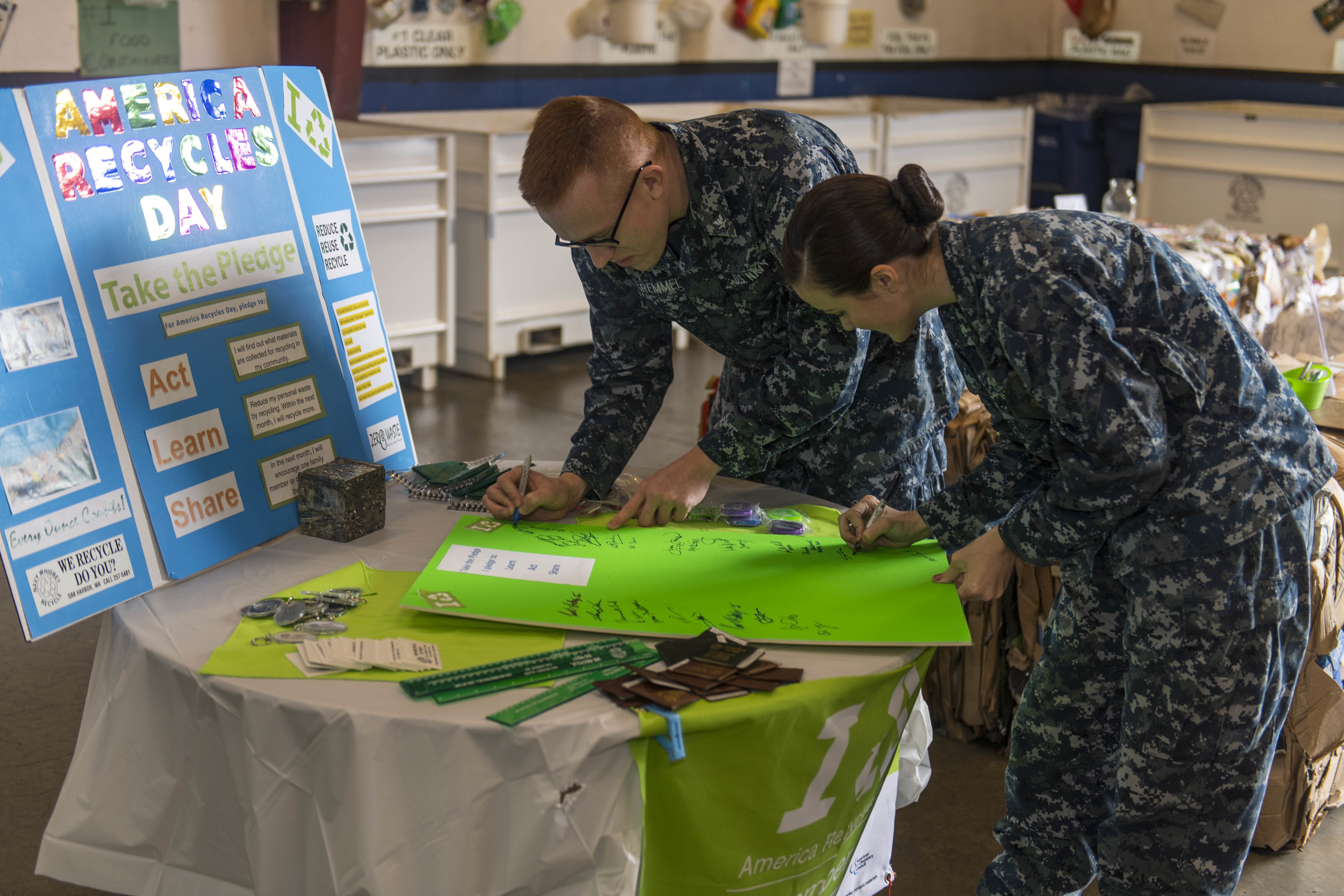
- America Recycles Day at Naval Air Station Whidbey Island.
- Also called: ARD, National Recycling Day
- Type: National
- Observances: Recycling and the proper ways to recycle in the United States
- Date: November 15
- Next time: November 15, 2026
- Frequency: Annual
- First time: 1997; 29 years ago

America Recycles Day, also known as National Recycling Day, is a national observance in the United States dedicated to promoting recycling across the nation. Observed on November 15 every year, the observance is the signature recycling program of Keep America Beautiful (KAB), the managing and promoting organization for the holiday.

== History ==
America Recycles Day (ARD) first started as Texas Recycles Day in 1994 as the idea of Kevin Tuerff and Valerie Davis, who were employees of the Texas Commission on Environmental Quality at the time. When the two later left their state jobs, they offered the idea of making a national recycling day to the Nation Recycling Coalition (NRC) who embraced the idea. The first America Recycles Day was announced in Orlando, Florida, during the NRC's 16th Annual Congress & Exposition by a parade of about 2,000 gathered people. On October 1, 1997, the NRC and EPA co-sponsored a press conference on the event with then Vice President Al Gore as the honorary chair. At least 40 states participated in the first America Recycles Day on November 15, 1994.

In 1999, President Bill Clinton published and signed a proclamation on America Recycles Day, making it a national observance. In the proclamation, the President promoted the environmental and economic benefits of recycling and emphasized the need for Americans to continue to recycle and buy recycled products. Every president to follow him continued to issue a proclamation for the observance each year, with the exception of President Donald J. Trump, who issued messages for the observance each year of his presidency instead of official proclamations.

The National Recycling Coalition continued advertising for the event, achieving 3,000 events across all 50 states in 2007. In 2009, however, the National Recycling Coalition announced they would file for Chapter 7 Bankruptcy and ultimately reorganized. Shortly before that, in the summer of 2009, Keep America Beautiful took ownership of the holiday from the struggling NRC and is still the managing entity for ARD.

== Celebration ==
America Recycles Day promotes and celebrates the proper ways to recycle and the importance of recycling. Each year there is a different theme for America Recycles Day, and 2020's theme is individual action. Keep America Beautiful celebrates the holiday by hosting and promoting recycling related events during the whole month of November. KAB reports having collected more than 1,250,000 pounds of recyclable material during these events in 2018. During America Recycles Day, KAB also drives people to take their #BeRecycled Pledge to increase recycling rates in the United States.
