= Road signs in Central America =

Road signs in Central American countries such as Guatemala, Honduras, El Salvador, Nicaragua and Costa Rica (except Belize and Panama) are regulated by the Manual Centroamericano de Dispositivos Uniformes para el Control del Transito, a Central American equivalent to the United States' MUTCD published by the Central American Integration System (SICA). As a result, road signs used in Central American countries are, in most ways, similar in design to road signs used in the United States, except that the metric system is used — e.g. speed limits are measured in kilometers per hour. Of the SICA countries, only Costa Rica has signed the 1968 Vienna Convention on Road Signs and Signals.

The first edition of the Manual Centroamericano de Dispositivos Uniformes para el Control del Transito was published in 2000 and most recently updated in 2014.

== Regulatory signs ==
Regulatory signs are used to indicate to the driver about the priority of passage, the existence of certain limitations, prohibitions and restrictions in the use of the road, according to the traffic laws and regulations of each country.

R-1-1
Stop sign

R-1-2
Give way

R-1-3
Give way (red right arrow)

R-1-4
Give way (green turn left arrow)

R-1-5
Pedestrian priority

R-1-6
Railway or tram crossing

R-1-7
Right lane

R-1-8
Tram crossing plaque

R-1-9
Transit Route Yield Right of Way

R-2-1
Maximum speed limit

R-2-1
Maximum speed limit

R-2-2
Vehicle speed limit

R-2-3
Night speed limit

R-2-4
Fog speed limit

R-2-5
25 KPH plaque

R-2-6
Minimum speed limit

R-2-7
Maximum and minimum speed limit

R-2-8
Lowered speed limit

R-2-9
Lowered speed limit ahead

R-2-10
If you see one (arrow symbol), lowered speed applies

R-2-11
End lowered speed limit

R-2-12
End residential speed limit, begin 50 KPH speed limit

R-3-1a
No straight through

R-3-1b
No straight through

R-3-2a
No entry

R-3-2b
Wrong way

R-3-3a
No right turn

R-3-3b
No right turn

R-3-4a
No left turn

R-3-4b
No left turn

R-3-5a
No right turn on red

R-3-5b
No right turn on red

R-3-6
Applies from 6AM-8AM, except sundays

R-3-7
Applies from 5AM-10PM

R-3-8
Turn to the left

R-3-9
Turn to the right

R-3-10
No turns

R-3-11a
No U-turn

R-3-11b
No U-turn

R-3-12a
U-turn permitted

R-3-12b
U-turn permitted

R-3-13
Left turn only (right if reversed)

R-3-15a
Center lane, Two way left turn only

R-3-15b
Two way left turn only

R-3-16
Two way left turn lane begins

R-3-17
Two way left turn lane ends

R-3-19
Begin right turn lane yield to bikes

R-4-1
Controlled access roundabout

R-4-3
Stop here on red to the left

R-4-3
Stop here on red to the right

R-4-4
Do not block intersection

R-4-5
Do not block tram line

R-4-6
Right turn permitted on red

R-4-7
Yield before turning right on red

R-4-8
Left turn permitted, yield on green

R-4-9
Do not block bus lane

R-5-1
Reversible lane begins

R-5-2
Reversible lane ends

R-5-3
Begin reversible lane 6am-8am except Sunday

R-5-4
End reversible lane 6am-8am except Sunday

R-5-5
Reversible lane 6am-8am except Sunday

R-5-6
Reversible lane 6am-8am except Sunday

R-5-7
Reversible lane ahead

R-5-8
Reversible lane ahead

R-5-9
Reversible lane ahead

R-6-1
Keep Right

R-6-2
Proceed right

R-6-3
Proceed left

R-6-4
Proceed with caution

R-6-5
Divided highway

R-6-6
Divided highway

R-6-7
Keep Right, Divided Highway

R-6-8
Keep right (left if reversed)

R-6-9
Pass On Either Side

R-7-1
No trucks

R-7-2
No left turn for trucks

R-7-3
No left turn for articulated trucks

R-7-4
No dangerous materials

R-7-5
No explosive materials

R-7-6a
Trucks use right lane

R-7-6b
Slow traffic, use right lane

R-7-7
Climbing lane, Trucks keep right

R-7-8a
Fast traffic keep left

R-7-8b
Fast traffic, use left lanes

R-7-9
Emergency ramp, keep left lane clear

R-7-10
Minimum separation

R-7-11
Keep 2 arrows, Minimum separation 50 meters

R-7-12
Pedestrians to the left

R-7-13a
Pedestrians to the left, bicycles to the right

R-7-13a
Bicycles to the left, pedestrians to the right

R-7-14a
No pedestrians

R-7-14b
No pedestrians

R-7-15a
No bicycles

R-7-15b
No bicycles

R-7-16
No motor vehicles

R-7-17
No taxis

R-7-18
No vehicles on the beach

R-7-19
Do not drive on tracks

R-7-20
No vehicles on tracks

R-7-21
Do not pass stopped trains

R-7-22
No animal drawn vehicles

R-7-23
No agricultural vehicles

R-7-24
No Commercial Vehicles

R-7-25
Vehicle Prohibition For Plates Starting With Certain Numbers On Certain Days

R-8-1
No parking

R-8-2
No parking from 6am to 8pm

R-8-3a
No parking, tow-away zone

R-8-3b
No parking, tow-away zone

R-8-4a
No parking, bike lane

R-8-4b
No parking, bike lane

R-8-5a
No parking, bus stop

R-8-5b
No parking, bus stop

R-8-5b
No parking, bus stop

R-8-5b
No parking, bus stop

R-8-6
No parking in double file

R-8-11
No stopping

R-8-12
No stopping on bridge

R-8-13
No stopping on pavement

R-8-14
No stopping except on shoulder

R-8-15
No parking on right of way

R-8-16
No stopping on island

R-8-17
No stopping on green zone

R-8-18
No stopping on sidewalk

R-8-19
No stopping on to repair vehicles

R-8-20
Do Not Repair Vehicles On Road

R-8-21
Emergency Stopping Only

R-8-26
Parking Permitted All Times

R-8-27
Parking Permitted 8AM To 5PM

R-8-28
5 Minute Hotel Parking

R-8-29
Parking spot, reserved for disabled persons

R-8-30
Parking spot, reserved for pregnant persons

R-8-31
Parking spot, reserved for elderly persons

R-9-1
Exclusive lane begins

R-9-2
Exclusive lane ends

R-9-3
Exclusive lane begins

R-9-4
Exclusive lane ends

R-9-5
Exclusive lane operation

R-9-6
Center lane, buses only

R-9-7
Center lane, high occupancy vehicles only

R-9-8
Center lane, buses and high occupancy vehicles only

R-9-9
Roadway, exclusive for buses

R-9-10
Exclusive lane for parking entrance only, maximum 200m

R-9-11
Bicycle lane ahead

R-9-12
Right lane for bicycles only

R-9-13
Center lane for trains only

R-9-14
Right lane for emergency use only

R-9-15
Lane for buses only

R-9-16
Exclusive lane for firefighters

R-10-1
Bus stop

R-10-2
Bus stop with route number

R-10-3
Tram stop

R-10-4
Taxi stop

R-10-5
Cargo taxi stop

R-10-6
Loading and unloading zone

R-10-7
Bus stop removed

R-10-8
No boarding of buses

R-10-9
Taxi stop removed

R-10-10
No boarding of taxis

R-11-1a
No pedestrian crossing, use safety zone to the left

R-11-1a
No pedestrian crossing, use safety zone to the right

R-11-1b
No pedestrian crossing

R-11-2
No pedestrian crossing

R-11-3
Cross only in pedestrian safety zones

R-11-4
Pedestrian safety zone to the left

R-11-4
Pedestrian safety zone to the right

R-11-5
Use pedestrian safety zone to the left

R-11-5
Use pedestrian safety zone to the right

R-11-6
No pedestrian crossing, use pedestrian bridge to the left

R-11-6
No pedestrian crossing, use pedestrian bridge to the right

R-11-7
Cross On Bridge Only

R-11-8
Pedestrian bridge

R-11-9
Use pedestrian bridge to the left

R-11-9
Use pedestrian bridge to the right

R-11-10
Pedestrian tunnel

R-11-11
Use pedestrian tunnel to the left

R-11-11
Use pedestrian tunnel to the right

R-11-12
Cross only on pedestrian crossing signal

R-11-13
Push button for pedestrian crossing signal

R-11-14
Cross only with green light

R-11-15
Push button for green light

R-11-16
Push indication button to cross

R-11-17
Bicycles use pedestrian crossing signal

R-11-18
Bicycles yield to pedestrians

R-12-1
Height limit

R-12-2
Width limit

R-12-3
Weight limit

R-12-4
Weight limit per axle

R-12-6
One Heavy Vehicle At A Time

R-13-1
No passing

R-13-2
No passing by trucks

R-13-3
End of no passing

R-13-4
End of no passing by trucks

R-13-5
Use headlights

R-13-6
Pass with care

R-13-7
End of headlight use

R-13-8
No Honking

R-14-1
Customs

R-14-2
Toll

R-14-3
Police

R-14-4
Weighing

R-14-5
Fumigation

R-14-6
Truck Route

R-15-1
Road Closed

R-15-2
Road Closed Ahead

R-15-3
Road Closed 10 Km Local Traffic Only

R-15-4
Road Closed To Thru Traffic

R-15-5
Sidewalk Closed

R-15-6
Crosswalk Closed, Use Other Side

R-15-7
Sidewalk Closed Ahead, Cross Here

R-15-8
One way left

R-15-9
One way Right

R-15-10
Two way

R-15-11
Turn left, go straight, or turn right

R-15-12
Go straight, or turn right

R-15-13
Two way traffic ahead

R-15-14
Two way traffic, keep right

R-15-15
Two way traffic

R-16-1
Use seat belt

R-16-2
Legal blood alcohol limit 0.05%

R-16-3
People driving over 120 KPH will be charged with reckless driving

R-16-4
Automatic Traffic Enforcement

R-16-5a
No littering

R-16-5b
No littering

R-16-6
Traffic Fine

=== Sign Assemblies ===
R1-1 and R1-5
Stop/Yield to Pedestrians

P1-1 and R2-5
Curve with Advisory Speed

== Route signs ==
II-1-1a
PanAmerican Route

II-1-2a
Central American Route

II-1-3a
National Route

II-1-4a
Secondary Route

II-1-5a
Tertiary Route

II-1-1b
PanAmerican Route

II-1-2b
Central American Route

II-1-3b
National Route

II-1-4b
Secondary Route

II-1-5b
Tertiary Route

II-1-6a
Regional Route

II-1-6b
Regional Route

II-1-7b
Bicycle Route number

II-2-1
Junction

II-4-3
Street name

II-4-4
Street name

II-4-5
Street name

II-4-6
Street name

II-4-7
Street name with color tab

II-4-8
Street name with business name tab

II-5-4
Highway Sign

II-5-5
Highway Sign

II-5-6
Highway Sign

II-5-7
Toll Highway Sign

II-5-8
Controlled Access Highway Sign

II-5-9
Tollway Sign

II-5-10
Tollway Sign

II-6-1
Crossover

II-6-2
Indirect Left Turns

II-6-3
Indirect Left Turns

II-6-4
Indirect Left Turns

II-6-5
Indirect Left Turns

II-6-6
Lane Movement

== Destination and Distance signs ==
ID-1-5
Conventional road directional (2 destinations)

ID-1-6
Conventional road directional (3 destinations)

ID-1-7
Conventional road destination distance (1 destination)

ID-1-8
Conventional road destination distance (2 destinations)

ID-2-1
Directional Sign on Highways

ID-2-2
Directional Sign on Highways

ID-2-3
Directional Sign on Highways

ID-2-4
Directional Sign on Highways

ID-2-5
Destination and Distance Sign on Highways

ID-2-6
Destination and Distance Sign on Highways

ID-3-1
Costa Rica Ave Exit 500 Meters

ID-3-2
Next Exit 100 Meters

ID-3-3
Alajuela Next 2 Exits

ID-3-4
Uracas and Pavas Exit 1 Kilometer

ID-3-5
Exit Gore Sign

ID-3-6
Exit Gore Sign

ID-3-7
Lane Destination Sign

ID-3-8
Lane Destination Sign

ID-3-9
Lane Destination Sign

ID-3-10
Lane Destination Sign

ID-3-11
Lane Destination Sign

ID-3-12
Lane Destination Sign

ID-3-13
Lane Destination Sign

ID-3-14
Lane Destination Sign

ID-3-15
Lane Destination Sign

ID-3-16
Guide Sign for Highway Split

ID-3-17
Advance Exit Destination Sign

ID-3-18
Advance Exit Destination Sign

ID-3-19
Advance Exit Destination Sign

ID-3-20
Advance Exit Destination Sign

ID-3-21
Advance Directional Sign

ID-3-22
Advance Directional Sign

ID-3-23
Advance Directional Sign for Single Lane Roundabouts

ID-3-24
Advance Directional Sign for Multi Lane Roundabouts

ID-3-25
Small Vehicles

ID-3-26
All Vehicles

ID-3-31
To enter zone 14, Use left lane

ID-3-32
Light vehicles, Use left two lanes

ID-3-33
Exit only

ID-3-34
Exit only

ID-3-35
Right lane only

ID-3-36
Use left lane

== Service signs ==
IS-1-1
Telephone

IS-1-2
Emergency telephone

IS-1-3
Drinking water

IS-1-4
Gas

IS-1-5
Gas and repair shop

IS-1-6
Service station

IS-1-7
Red cross

IS-1-8
Emergency medical services

IS-1-9
Pharmacy

IS-1-10
Police

IS-1-11
Information

IS-1-12
Parking

IS-1-13
Postal service

IS-1-14
Internet

IS-1-15
Internet cafe

IS-1-14
Internet cafe to the left

IS-1-14
Internet cafe to the right

IS-1-16
Library

IS-1-17
Bank

IS-1-17
Bank to the left

IS-1-17
Bank to the right

IS-1-18
Automatic teller machine

IS-1-18
Automatic teller machine to the left

IS-1-18
Automatic teller machine to the right

IS-1-19
Drive-thru bank

IS-1-19
Drive-thru bank to the left

IS-1-19
Drive-thru bank to the right

IS-1-20
RV Facilities

IS-1-21
RV sewage disposal

IS-1-22
Accessible facility

IS-1-23
Wheelchair ascending ramp

IS-1-24
Wheelchair descending ramp

IS-1-25
Garbage can

== Warning signs ==
P-1-1
Sharp curve to the right (left if reversed)

P-1-2
45 degree right curve (left if reversed)

P-1-3
Sharp reverse curve right (left if reversed)

P-1-4
Double curve (first to right) (left if reversed)

P-1-5
Winding road ahead

P-1-6
Curve ahead

P-1-7
Direction large arrow right sign (left if reversed)

P-1-8
Direction large arrow left-right sign

P-1-9
Chevron sign

P-1-10
Exit speed advisory sign

P-1-11
Ramp speed advisory sign

P-1-12
Advisory exit ramp speed sign

P-1-13
Trucks may tip over on curve sign

P-1-14
30 KPH plaque

P-2-1
Crossroads

P-2-2
Offset side road intersection

P-2-3
Side road on the right (left if reversed)

P-2-4
Skewed side road

P-2-5
T-intersection

P-2-6
Y-intersection

P-2-7
Side road junction on a curve (outside) sign (right) (left if reversed)

P-2-8
Intersection ahead

P-3-1a
Stop sign ahead (symbol sign)

P-3-1b
Stop sign ahead (text sign)

P-3-2a
Yield sign ahead (symbol sign)

P-3-2b
Yield sign ahead (text sign)

P-3-3
Traffic signals ahead

P-3-4
Roundabout ahead

P-3-5
Access-controlled roundabout ahead

P-3-6
Access-controlled roundabout from 6AM-8PM

P-3-7
Signal changed

P-5-1
Road narrows

P-5-2
Road narrows

P-5-3
Bikeway narrows

P-5-4
Left lane closed

P-5-4
Right lane closed

P-5-5
Maximum width clearance

P-5-6
Narrow bridge

P-5-7
Narrow bridge

P-5-8
Maximum height clearance

P-5-9
Arch bridge clearance

P-5-10
Overhead cables

P-5-11
Safe height: 5.50m

P-6-1
Steep decline

P-6-2
Steep decline (Bicycles)

P-6-3
Steep decline that is hazardous to trucks

P-6-4
Use low gear

P-6-5
9% grade

P-6-6
Emergency ramp

P-6-7
Emergency ramp 1000m

P-6-8
Emergency ramp 500m

P-6-9
Emergency ramp

P-7-1
Loose gravel

P-7-2
Loose gravel

P-7-3
Slippery when wet

P-7-5
Slippery when wet

P-7-6
Pavement ends

P-7-7
Pavement ends

P-7-8
Shoudler in poor condition

P-7-9
Congestion ahead

P-7-10
Congestion ahead

P-7-11
Falling rocks

P-7-12
Falling rocks

P-7-13
Detour ahead

P-7-14
Provisional route ahead

P-7-15
Dangerous crosswinds

P-7-17
Fog area

P-7-18
Fog area

P-7-19
Area with heavy rain

P-7-20
Area with heavy rain

P-7-21
Use headlights

P-7-22
When foggy

P-7-23
When raining

P-7-24
Ford ahead

P-7-25
Ford ahead

P-7-26
Low flying aircraft

P-7-27
Low flying aircraft

P-7-28
Irregular surface

P-7-29
Irregular surface

P-7-30
Crest

P-7-31
Crest

P-7-32
Depression in road

P-7-33
Depression in road

P-7-34
Slow down

P-7-35
Slow down

P-8-1
Level crossing without barriers

P-8-2
Level crossing with barriers

P-8-3
Level crossing with T-intersection

P-8-4
Level crossing with side road

P-8-5
Level crossing with crossroads

P-8-6
Trams crossing

P-8-7
Buses crossing

P-9-1
Pedestrian crossing

P-9-2
Disabled pedestrians crossing

P-9-3
Pedestrian safety zone

P-9-4
Pedestrian crosswalk

P-9-5
Children at play

P-9-6
Playground

P-9-7
Residental area

P-9-9
Boom gate at entrance to Residential area

P-9-10
Bicycle crossing

P-9-11
Speed bump

P-9-12
Speed bump

P-9-13
Speed dip

P-10-1
Cattle crossing

P-10-2
Equestrian crossing

P-10-3
Deer crossing

P-10-4
Rabbit crossing

P-10-5
Tractor crossing

P-10-6
Trucks exiting

P-10-7
Next 10 km

P-10-8
Emergency vehicles exiting

P-10-9
Emergency vehicles

P-11-5
Right lane closed

P-11-6
Left lane closed

P-11-7
Side road with dead end

P-11-8
Crossroads with dead end

P-11-9
Skewed side road with dead end

P-11-10a
Dead end street

P-11-10b
Dead end street

P-11-11
Dead end street

P-12-4
Object marker

P-12-5
End of road marker

=== Sign Assemblies ===
P3-1a and P3-7
New Stop Sign Ahead

P3-4 and P3-5
Controlled Access Roundabout Ahead

P6-6 and P6-9
Emergency Ramp

== Temporary signs ==
PP-1-1
Sharp curve to the right (left if reversed)

PP-3-3
Traffic signals ahead

PP-5-1
Road narrows

PP-5-2
Road narrows

PP-5-4
Left lane closed

PP-5-4
Right lane closed

PP-5-5
Horizontal width clearance

PP-5-6
Narrow bridge

PP-5-7
Narrow bridge

PP-5-8
Height clearance

PP-7-1
Loose gravel

PP-7-2
Loose gravel

PP-7-3
Slippery when wet

PP-7-6
Pavement ends

PP-7-7
Pavement ends

PP-7-13
Detour ahead

PP-7-14
Provisional route ahead

PP-13-1
Road construction

PP-13-2
Road construction 1.5 km

PP-13-3
Detour 300m

PP-13-4
Road closed 300m

PP-13-7
Flagger ahead

PP-14-1
Road works

PP-14-5
Traffic survey

IP-1-1
Improvements by the ministry of transportation

IP-1-2
Construction by the ministry of transportation

IP-1-3
Bridge maintenance by the Ministry of transportation

== Emergency signs ==
IE-2-1
Volcano eruption

IE-2-2
Volcano eruption

IE-2-11
Forest fire

IE-2-12
Forest fire

IE-2-15
Radioactive contamination

IE-2-16
Radioactive contamination

IE-2-17
Biological contamination

IE-2-18
Biological contamination

IE-2-19
Chemical contamination

IE-2-20
Chemical contamination

IE-3-1
Area closed

IE-3-2
Road closed

IE-4-1
Traffic control point

IE-4-2
Maintain top speed

IE-4-3
Authorized vehicles only

IE-4-4
Double traction vehicles

IE-4-5
Double traction vehicles

IE-5-1
Decontamination center

IE-5-2
Fumigation post

IE-5-3
Fumigation post

== School signs ==
E-1-1
School zone

E-1-2
School zone 100m

E-1-3
School crossing

E-1-4
School bus stop ahead

E-1-5
School zone

E-2-1
School bus stop

E-2-2
School short bus stop

E-2-3
School unloading area, you may stop for 3 minutes

E-2-4
End of school zone speed limit

E-2-5
School zone, people driving over 70 kph will be charged with reckless driving

E-3-1
School zone

E-3-2
When children are present

E-3-2
25 KPH, when children are present

E-3-4
When flashing

E-3-5
25 KPH, when flashing

=== Sign Assemblies ===
E1-1 and E3-3
School Zone, 25 KPH, When Students are Present

E3-1, R2-1 and E3-2
School Speed Limit 25 KPH, When Students are Present

E3-1, R2-1 and E3-4
School Speed Limit 25 KPH, When Flashing
