= Keep Northern Ireland Beautiful =

Non-profit environmental organisation

Keep Northern Ireland Beautiful (KNIB), known until 2014 as TIDY Northern Ireland, is a non-profit environmental organisation based in Northern Ireland. In addition to running the "Keep Northern Ireland Tidy" campaign, it supports or provides grants for local environmental programmes such as the 'Beautiful Beach Awards', litter surveys, a 'Marine Litter Report', local gardening projects, an Eco-Schools program, Green Coast Awards, and the TIDY Business and Borough Cleanliness Survey. The organisation is registered as a charity with the Charity Commission for Northern Ireland. KNIB produces information on the cleanliness of Northern Ireland that is used to direct resources to environmental quality issues. It has conducted public information campaigns on litter, including on youth litter. It has also campaigned on issues such as fly-tipping, dog fouling and neighbourhood noise.

== History ==
Keep Northern Ireland Beautiful (KNIB), known until 2014 as TIDY Northern Ireland, is a non-profit environmental organisation. The charity was formed from a resolution passed at the Women's Institute annual general meeting in 1954. The Institute resolved to being an anti-litter campaign, which laid the foundation for the formation of KNIB.

The organisation is registered as a charity with the Charity Commission for Northern Ireland and, as of 2022, had 13 employees.

== Activities ==
In addition to running the "Keep Northern Ireland Tidy" campaign, it supports or provides grants for local environmental programmes such as the 'Beautiful Beach Awards', litter surveys, a 'Marine Litter Report', local gardening projects, an Eco-Schools program, Green Coast Awards, TIDY Business and Borough Cleanliness Survey. KNIB produces information on the cleanliness of Northern Ireland that is used to direct resources to environmental quality issues. It has conducted public information campaigns on litter, including on youth litter. It has also campaigned on issues such as fly-tipping, dog fouling and neighbourhood noise. KNIB also runs the 30 Under 30 Climate Change-Makers Programme, which aims to support and celebrate young leaders in climate-change activities.

Some KNIB campaigns have been supported by celebrities, including ABBA and Morecambe and Wise.

Much of the organisation's work overlaps with the Clean Neighbourhoods and Environment (NI) Act 2011, The Litter (NI) Order 1994 and The Waste and Contaminated Land (NI) Order 1997.

== See also ==
- Keep America Beautiful
- Keep Britain Tidy
- Keep New Zealand Beautiful
- Keep Scotland Beautiful
- Keep Wales Tidy
