= Alice Rush McKeon =

American Author and Environmentalist

- Born: Alice Rush; March, 1884; Philadelphia, PA
- Died: February 24, 1979; Ruxton, Maryland
- Occupation: Author
- Known for: Gardening Advocacy and Environmental Activism
- Notable work: The Litterbug Family
- Spouse: Edward H. McKeon

Alice Rush McKeon was a Maryland author and environmentalist. She was born in March 1884 in Philadelphia, PA, and died in Ruxton, MD in February 1979. McKeon was a direct descendent of founding father and signatory of the Declaration of Independence, Benjamin Rush. She was credited as the prime force behind the signing of Maryland's first billboard control law.

== Work and advocacy ==
An early advocate for highway beautification, she is credited by some with coining the term litterbug. She took particular interest at curbing the spread of roadside billboards, and advocated strongly for their removal.

McKeon wrote the 1931 book The Litterbug Family which includes poems and pictures about the problem of littering, and leads with the words "Look at your pavements and roadsides. Have YOU been a LITTER-BUG?". The book is credited with helping spur the passage of the first billboard control law in Maryland, to fight what she called "billboard blight".

McKeon was an avid gardener, and twice served as president of the Federated Garden Clubs of Maryland. She also hosted a radio program on Baltimore station WBAL (AM) called "Garden Clubs of the Air". She also wrote a short book called "Dear Mrs. Radio" based on the show.
