= Litter in the United States =

Crime and environmental issue

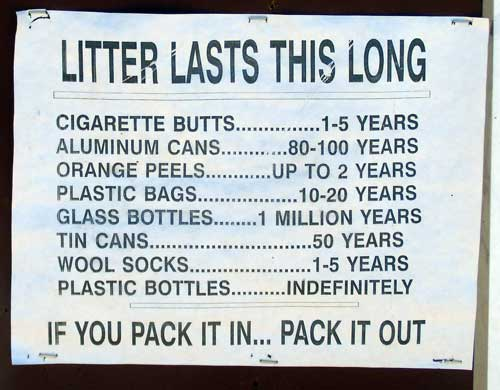
Sign posted by the U.S. Forest Service in the Los Padres National Forest

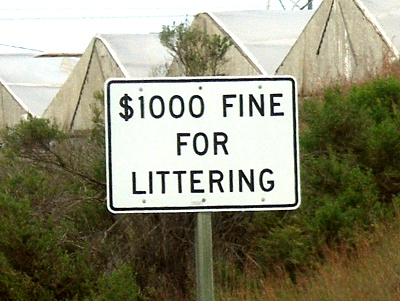
California posts the maximum fine on its roadside signs.

Litter in the United States is an environmental issue and littering is often a criminal offense, punishable with a fine as set out by statutes in many places.

Litter laws, enforcement efforts, and court prosecutions are used to help curtail littering. All three are part of a "comprehensive response to environmental violators", write Epstein and Hammett, researchers for the United States Department of Justice. Littering and dumping laws, found in all fifty United States, appear to take precedence over municipal ordinances in controlling violations and act as public safety, not aesthetic measures. Similar from state-to-state, these laws define who violators are, the type or "function" of the person committing the action, and what items must be littered or dumped to constitute an illegal act. Municipal ordinances and state statutes require a "human action" in committing illegal littering or dumping, for one to be "held in violation." Most states require law enforcement officers or designated, authorized individuals, to "...witness the illegal act to write a citation." Together, prosecutions and punitive fines are important in fighting illegal littering and dumping.

A significant portion of litter along roadways in the U.S. is now being attributed to improperly tarped vehicles such as open-bed vehicles as well as trash and recycling collection vehicles that have not been properly secured.

A national survey of United States prosecutors noted the most important factor in prosecuting an offense was the "degree of harm" a violation posed and the "criminal intent" of the offender. America's most prosecuted littering offense involve illegal hazardous waste disposals. Civil and criminal fines are the "most common strategy governments use to control environmental behaviors." Most offenders settle outside of court. For small littering, a monetary penalty and/or a specified number of hours picking up litter or community service is the typical punishment. Going to jail for a littering/dumping conviction is rare.

For example, in California the punishment for first-time littering starts at a minimum $250 fine and eight hours of picking up roadside litter. A defendant's third offense and all subsequent offenses are punished with a maximum penalty of a $3,000 fine and 24 hours of litter cleanup (per offense). Such penalties are often prominently posted on roadside signs.

In Idaho, the Comprehensive Litter Prevention and Abatement Act was signed into law in 2006. Litterers can be fined up to $180 when including a subcharge of US$80 and be ordered to clean a littered area in the community.

In Washington State, the littering of (especially lit) cigarettes can incur a fine of up to $500. During the summer months, drought-like conditions and tinder-dry forests, lit or smoldering debris have started many wildfires. State litter surveys have shown that an average of 352 pounds of litter is picked up for every mile of highway including about 3,000 cigarette butts. In 2002, some 350 car accidents involved litter or road debris.

In the state of Oregon, throwing a lighted cigarette or other tobacco product is a Class B misdemeanor, and is punishable by a fine of up to $2,500 and 6 months' imprisonment. This is in addition to penalties for "placing offensive substances in waters, on highways or other property" which is a Class A misdemeanor and carries a maximum fine of $6,250 and 12 months' imprisonment.

== Littering Surveys and Rankings ==
Since the 1970s, over 70 studies measuring littering, its contents and impacts on local and state governments, have taken place in both the United States and Canada, according to Reducing Litter on Roadsides by the Transportation Board of the National Research Academies.

More recently, litter has been identified as a problem for storm water systems, prompting litter surveys to determine the characterization of storm water trash and the extent to which various components of litter contribute to this problem.

== Citizen Cleanup in the United States ==
The "Caught Doing Good!" campaign, started by the Pennsylvania Resources Council, implemented a system that rewarded citizens who were caught using proper receptacles to dispose of their trash in city streets.

National CleanUp Day is held annually on the third Saturday in September.

== See also ==
- Container deposit legislation in the United States (container deposit legislation as a measure for reducing litter)
- Don't Mess with Texas
- Environmental issues in the United States
- Keep America Beautiful
- National Cleanup Day
- Plastic bag bans in the United States
