= Keep Wales Tidy =

Charity organisation

- Cadwch Gymru'n Daclus (Welsh)
- Abbreviation: KWT
- Formation: 2009
- Registration no.: 1082058
- Legal status: Charitable organisation
- Purpose: Practical action, environmental education, training, business services and environmental solutions across Wales
- Location: Wales
- Chief executive officer: Owen Derbyshire
- Website: keepwalestidy.cymru

Keep Wales Tidy (Welsh: Cadwch Gymru'n Daclus) is a Welsh national voluntary environmental charity which works towards achieving "a clean, safe and tidy Wales". It works in partnership with Local Authorities, schools and community groups, and organisations such as Waste Awareness Wales and Environment Wales in order to achieve these goals.

== History ==
Keep Wales Tidy started as a campaign in 1972, funded by the Welsh Office. At this time it was an offshoot of the charity Keep Britain Tidy.

In 2000 Keep Wales Tidy established itself as a separate company, beginning the process of separation from the parent group, and this was completed in 2005. Today there are no formal ties between the two groups, although they often collaborate on common issues.

In 2008 the organisation adopted a Fair Trade policy, sourcing items like coffee, tea and biscuits from Fair Trade outlets. Larger items such as staff T-shirts are also Fair Trade sourced.

== Projects ==
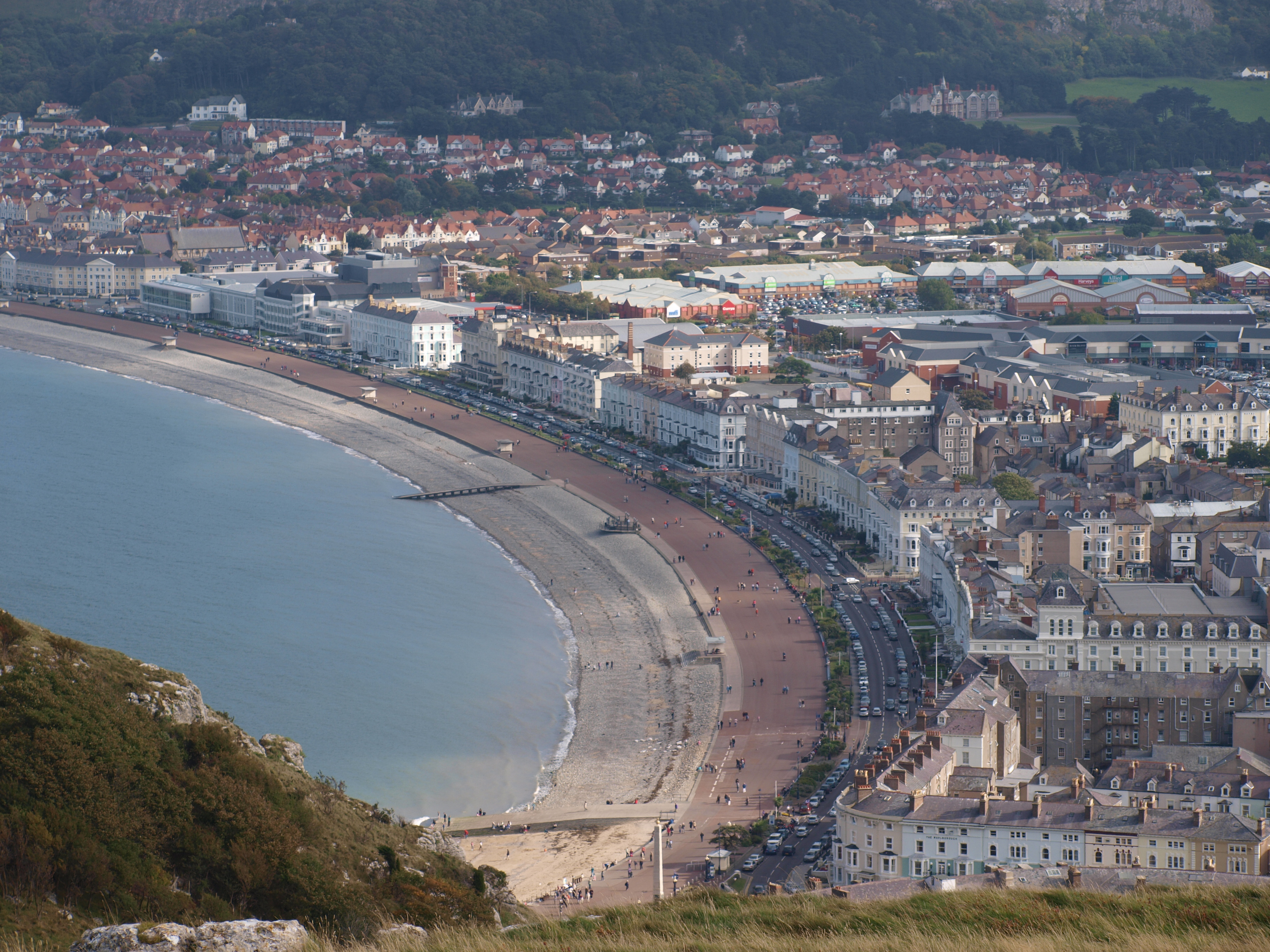
Llandudno North Shore - a Blue Flag Award holder (2011)

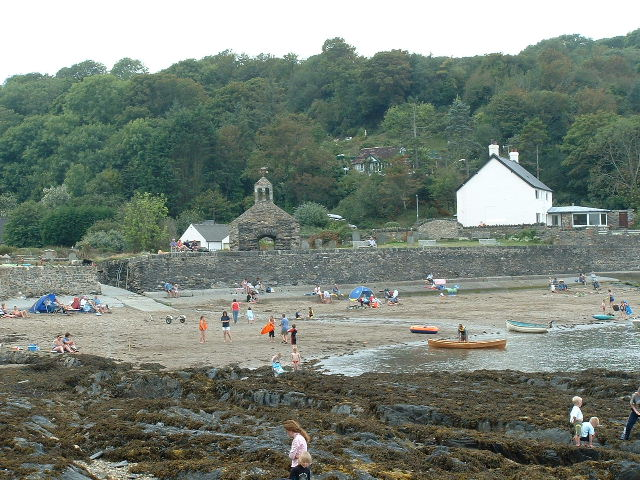
The beach at Cwm-yr-Eglwys - a Green Coast Award holder (2011)

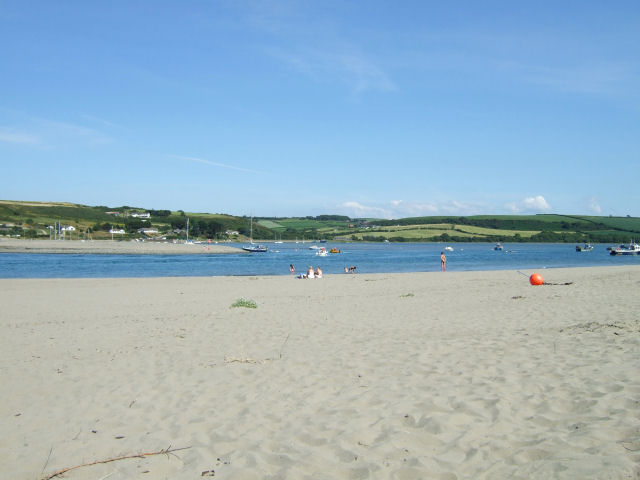
Poppit Sands, in northern Pembrokeshire - a Seaside Award holder (2011)

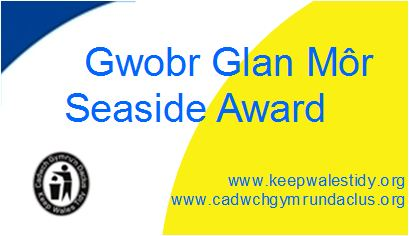
The Seaside Award logo

Keep Wales Tidy runs a number of projects, including:

=== Tidy Towns ===
This project works to improve the environment in Wales. The Welsh Assembly Government has given all Welsh local authorities a Tidy Towns grant, and each one now has a Tidy Towns Officer. Much of their work in this area is on general litter issues. Through this initiative, Keep Wales Tidy is also able to offer financial assistance to groups who wish to improve their home areas, with grants awarded to cover the cost of tools, equipment, publicity and training.

=== Eco-Schools ===
This project works with children and young people in the school environment. Sustainability issues are a part of the scheme, and 3 awards can be earned - Bronze, Silver, and Green Flag.

=== Coastal Awards ===
Keep Wales Tidy administers 3 different awards related to beaches, namely the Blue Flag Award, the Green Coast Award and the Seaside Award. All 3 categories have the environmental management of the beach as a central factor, be this by the local authority, or by volunteer organisations. The awards are made annually, but may be withdrawn during the season if the criteria are not fulfilled, or if circumstances change. Welsh Water / Dŵr Cymru plays an important role in this work, through its Green Sea Partnership.

The Blue Flag Award, introduced in 1999, is given where strict criteria are met, relating to water quality, cleanliness, management and safety. A total of 41 beaches and 5 marinas were awarded Blue Flags in 2011.

The Green Coast Award (originally known as the Green Seas Initiative) has water quality and environmental criteria, and is awarded to more isolated locations where the infrastructure and facilities are insufficient to be able to achieve full Blue Flag or Seaside (Resort) status. The Green Coast Award is unique in that it recognises Guideline water quality (i.e. the EU designation for water quality). 47 beaches were awarded the Green Coast Award in 2011.

The Seaside Award is given annually to beaches which can attain a minimum standard in water quality, cleanliness, safety and management. Given the variation in types of beaches, two categories of beach are considered - resort and rural. Rural beaches may have little in the way of facilities (an information board must show the nearest facilities), whereas resort beaches will provide such facilities as lifeguards, First Aid points, toilets, car parks and safe access, and access for dogs will be limited. The number of beaches awarded Seaside Awards in 2011 was 104.

The full criteria for Resort Beach status can be found here.

The full criteria for Rural Beach status can be found here.

=== "I Will for Wales" ===
Keep Wales Tidy promoted its "I Will for Wales" / "Fe Wnaf dros Gymru" campaign at the National Eisteddfod in Wrexham in 2011.

== See also ==
- Cardiff Rivers Group
- Earth Day
- Keep Britain Tidy
- National Cleanup Day
- World Cleanup Day
- Plogging
