= Let's Do It =

Let's Do It may refer to:

== General ==
- Let's Do It 2008, an environmental cleanup campaign in Estonia
  - Let's Do It! World, an international civic movement that originated from the Estonian campaign
  - Let's do it! Armenia, an environmental cleanup campaign in Armenia
- "Let's do it!", the last words of the American criminal Gary Gilmore in 1977

== Media ==
=== Music ===
- "Let's Do It", or "Let's Do It, Let's Fall in Love", popular song by Cole Porter
- Let's Do It (album) (1972), by Roy Ayers
- "Let's Do It" (song), by Lil Baby, Playboi Carti and Skooly
- "Let's Do It", song by DD Osama, 2021
- "Let's Do It", song by Diana Ross from Thank You, 2021
- "Let's Do It", song by Ugly God from Indy 100, 2016

=== Television ===
- Let's Do It (TV series), 1974 Canadian sports instruction series
- "Let's Do It" (The L Word), 2004 television episode
- "Let's Do It" (Miranda), a 2010 television episode

== See also ==
- "O Let's Do It", a song by Waka Flocka Flame
- Let's Do It Again (disambiguation)
