= Ecologists Without Borders =

Ecologists Without Borders Association
- Društvo Ekologi brez meja
- Formation: Ljubljana, Slovenia (2009)
- Type: NGO
- Purpose: Resource efficiency, Activism
- Location: Trubarjeva 50, Ljubljana
- Coordinates: 46.05222°N 14.51222°E
- Website: www.ebm.si/en/

Ecologists Without Borders Association (Slovene: Društvo Ekologi brez meja) is a non-profit environmentalist organization founded in March 2009 in Slovenia with the intent of organizing environmental projects. The organization has its headquarters in Ljubljana, with members spread throughout the country.

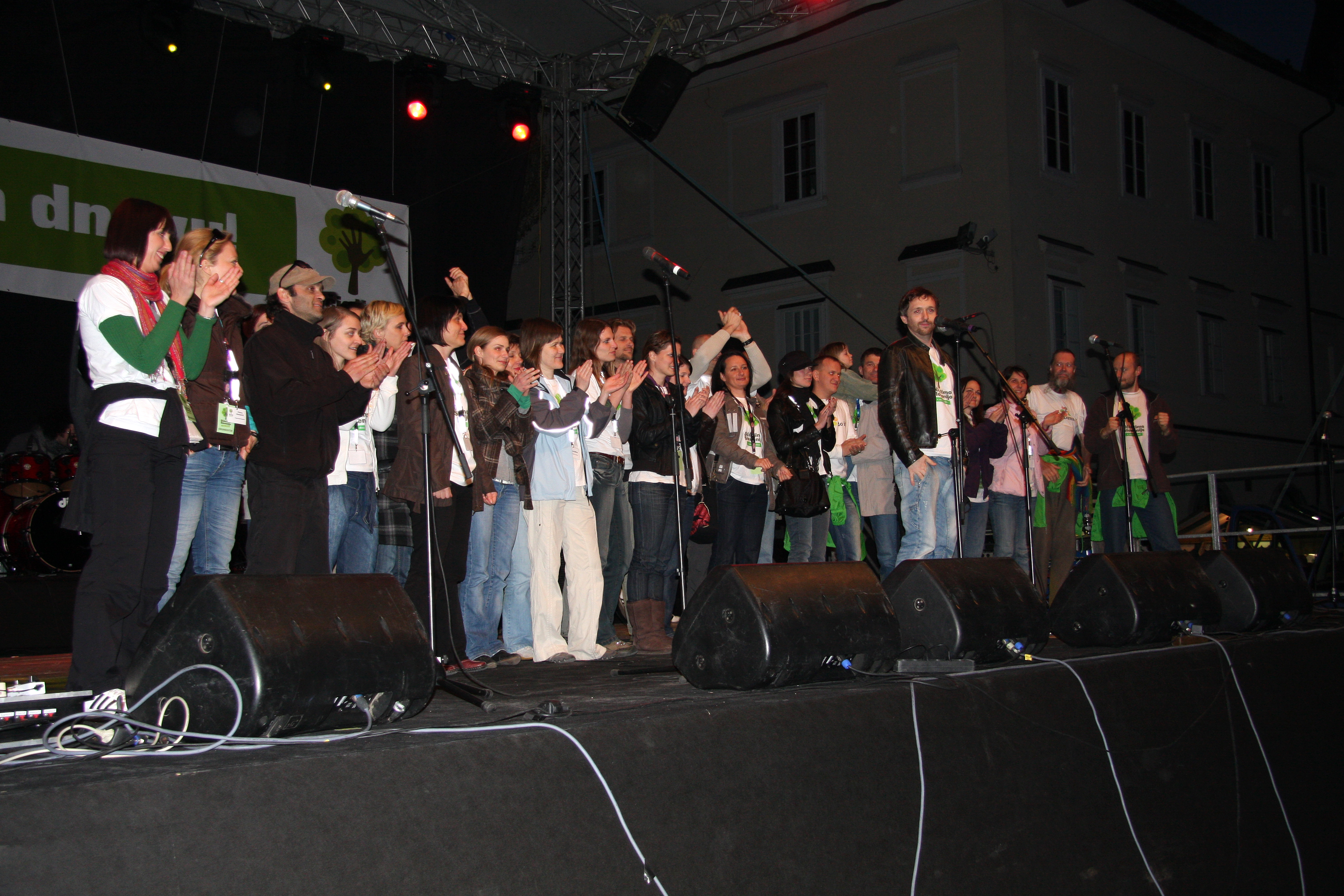
Members after the Let's Clean Slovenia in One Day! event (2010)

In 2010 and 2012, the association organized the largest environmental volunteer action in Slovenia, which attracted over 13% of the residents (over 270,000 people out of ca. 2 million inhabitants), including the heads of the state, the military and hundreds of organizations. Both Let's Clean Slovenia in One Day! (2010) and Let's Clean Slovenia 2012 broke the record as the largest civic initiatives in modern Slovenia, each time joining over 13% of the country's population. For their achievement, the organization received the Order of Merit of Slovenia in 2010. In parallel, Ecologists Without Borders have been organizing other events for raising awareness about waste management issues and maintaining the register of illegal dumps that was developed in collaboration with Slovene mapping service Geopedia.

Nives Dolšak, an associate professor at the University of Washington, researcher of common pool resources, characterised their work as phenomenal and an incredible success. The group ascribed their success to a tradition of care for environment in Slovenia. Nevertheless, they stated that the event will not be organized again. It was meant primarily for raising awareness, so repeating it would dilute the message and abet persistent polluters. They stated the same after the 2010 event, but then decided to organize it once more in order to support the global action World Cleanup 2012. Nonetheless, their focus had long shifted to prevention measures and promotion of the Zero Waste philosophy.

Ecologists Without Borders (Slovenia) is not affiliated with Ecologists Without Borders - EcoWB (USA).
