= Clean-up (environment) =

Environmental action to remove litter from a place

Volunteers in Brooklyn, New York

A cleanup or clean-up is a form of environmental volunteering where a group of people get together to pick-up and dispose of litter in a designated location. Cleanups can take place on a street, in a neighborhood, at a park, on a water stream, or other public spaces. Cleanup events are often volunteer run. The cleanup volunteers make sure the waste picked-up is disposed of in its appropriate place. Cleanup events are often community-centered and led.

During the COVID-19 pandemic litter picking participation has greatly increased in the UK. There are a vast range of reasons that people take part in litter picking activities. These include: clearing up unsightly areas; protecting wildlife; keeping people safe, connecting with nature, finding valuables, being part of a community, mental and physical health benefits and acting to protect the environment.

== Examples and initiatives ==
Stridy, a non-profit organisation headquartered in Singapore, is dedicated to promoting environmental cleanliness and tidiness by engaging citizens in community-driven initiatives. Founded with a mission to foster a sense of civic responsibility, Stridy encourages individuals to actively participate in maintaining a clean and litter-free environment. The organisation organises community clean-up events, educational programs, and awareness campaigns to inspire positive change in local neighbourhoods and beyond, fostering a global community of active citizens passionate about urban and beach clean-ups. Stridy has also developed a free-to-use app, empowering users to track their litter picking impact all around the world and allowing anyone to view global efforts from the Stridy data dashboard, contributing to a cleaner and more sustainable future through the power of community action. Since the beginning of 2022, a total of 100,000 litter items have been gathered from places like parks and residential areas in Singapore.

== See also ==
- Volunteering
- Plogging
- Earth Day
- National CleanUp Day
- World Cleanup Day
