= Uusberg =

Uusberg is a surname. Notable people with the surname include:

- Pärt Uusberg (born 1986), Estonian composer
- Urve Uusberg (born 1953), Estonian conductor
