= Estonian Volunteer of the Year =

Estonian award for volunteer workers

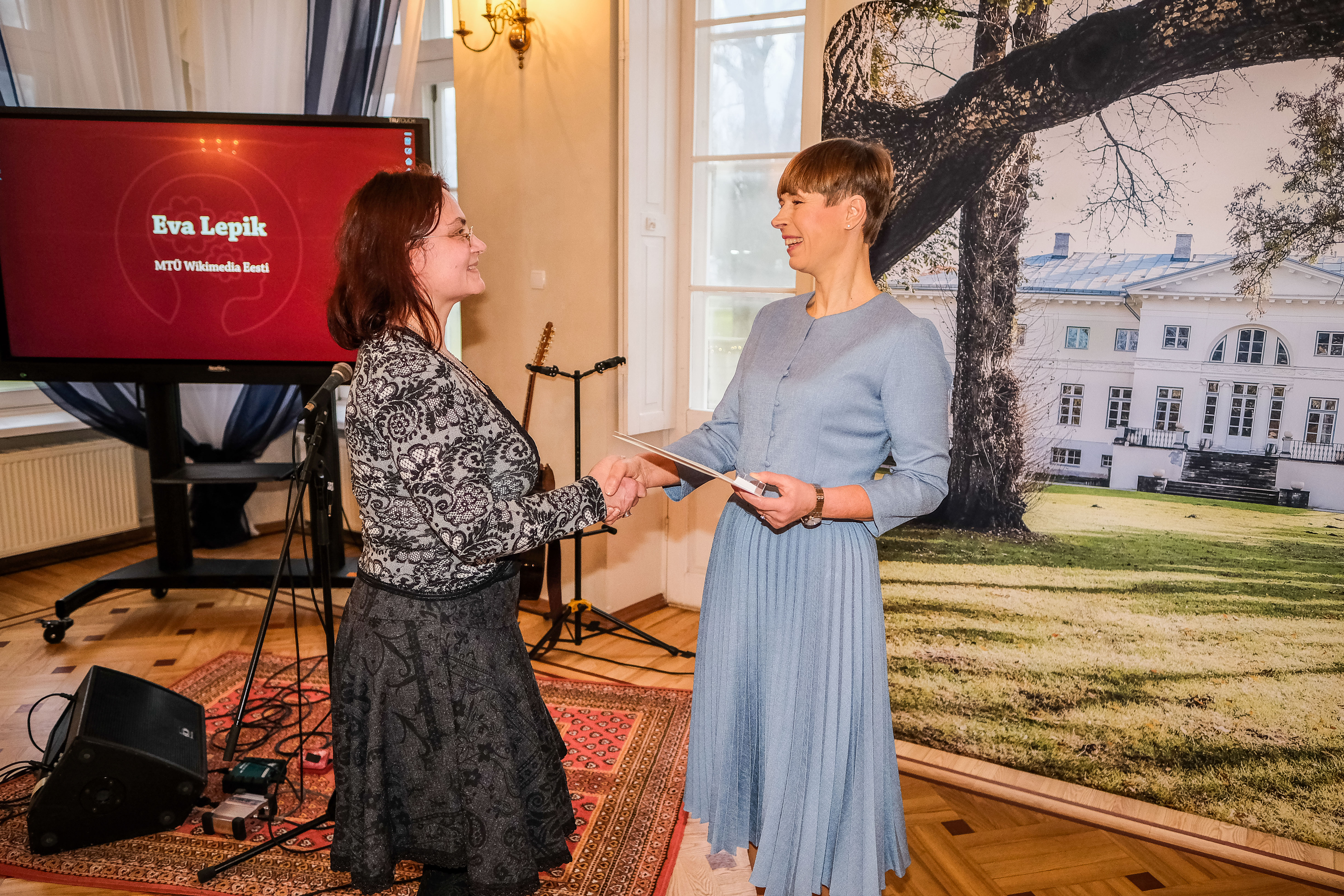
Eva Lepik, Volunteers of the Year award, 2019

The Volunteer of the Year (Estonian: Aasta vabatahtlik) is a national award in Estonia for volunteer work, established in 2005.

== 2008 ==
On December 7, 2008 President of Estonia Toomas Hendrik Ilves presented the award to the following 15 people:

- Peeter Kuudu
- Monika Rusing
- Tõnis Puss
- Aado Kuhlap
- Maaja Glaser
- Liis Lill
- Helju Kukk
- Rainer Nõlvak – for organizing Let's Do It 2008
- Uno Aan
- Üllar Saaremäe – for organizing Estonian Punk Song Festival
- Urve Uusberg
- Aune Suve
- Andres Luure – for his contributions to Estonian Wikipedia
- Helo Meigas
- Ahti Heinla – for organizing Let's Do It 2008

During the ceremony the rock group Terminaator played four of their songs: "Osa minust", "Romula", "See ei ole saladus", and "Tahan ärgata üles".
