= Digital Cleanup Day =

Annual environmental awareness event

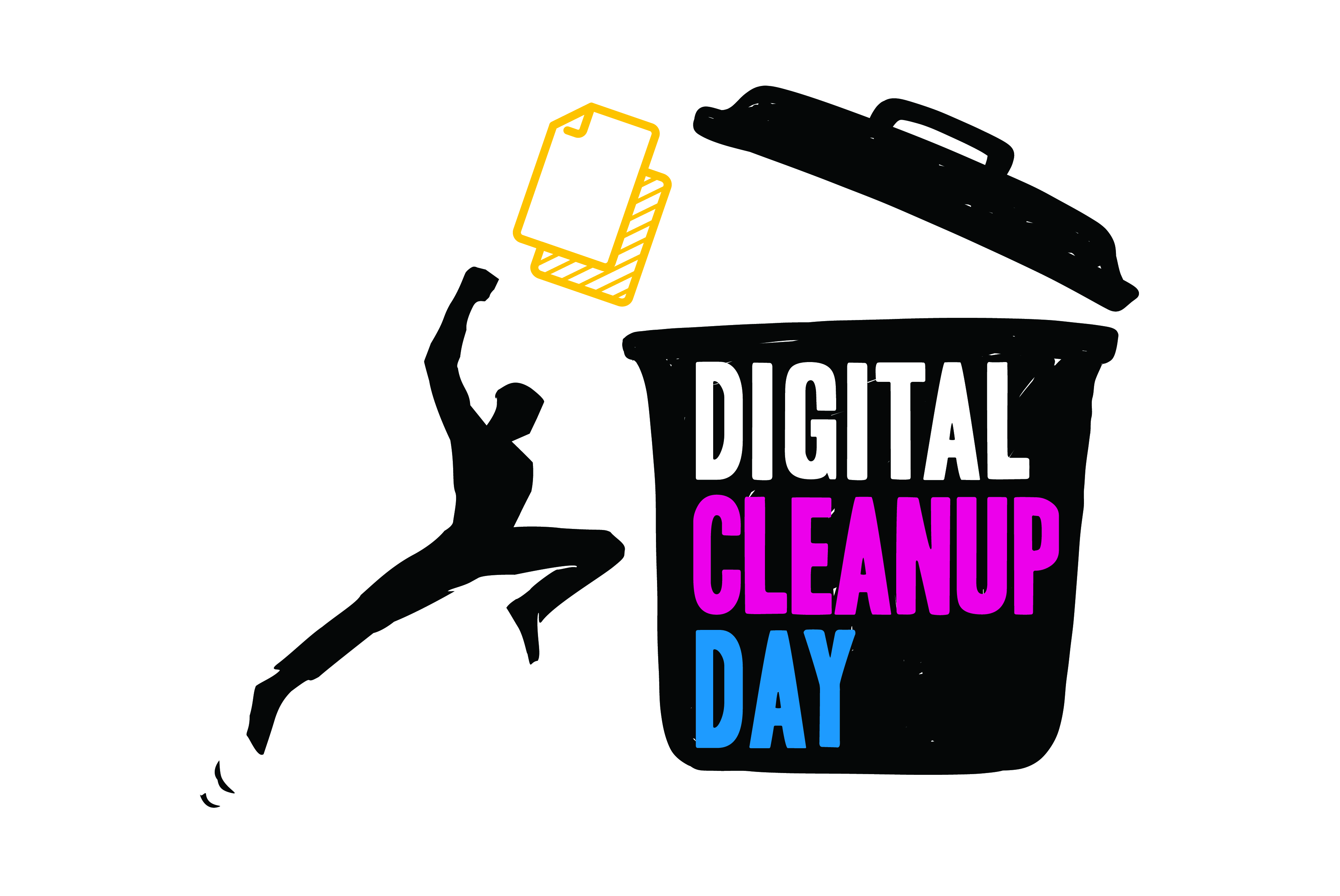
- Formation: 2020
- Founders: Kevin Guerin
- Type: Collective of associations: Institut du numérique responsable, World Cleanup Day France, Let's Do It! World
- Purpose: Raising awareness of the environmental impact of digital technology through action
- Headquarters: Roosikrantsi 3, Tallinn, Estonia
- Region served: Worldwide (more than 170 countries and territories)
- Methods: Mobilizing businesses, local authorities, associations, schools, citizens, and individuals to organize Digital Cleanups every March to clean up their data, repair their digital equipment, or collect digital WEEE (Waste Electrical and Electronic Equipment)
- President: Heidi Solba
- Website: www.digitalcleanupday.org

The Digital Cleanup Day is an annual event to raise global awareness about the environmental impact of the digital industry. This initiative encourages people to take concrete action by cleaning up their digital data and/or giving a second life to their unused computer equipment. It takes place every third Saturday in March.

== History ==
In 2019, drawing inspiration from the World Cleanup Day, computer scientist Kévin Guerin came up with the idea of a digital version specifically focused on Cyberspace and comparable to Black Friday/Cyber Monday: the Cyber World CleanUp Day. Guerin proposed a partnership between World Cleanup Day France, which would provide communication and mobilization expertise, and the think tank Institute of Sustainable IT (ISIT), which would provide the technical expertise for a more environmentally responsible digital world.

The event was launched in France in 2020. The COVID-19 pandemic provided the opportunity to convey eight easy recipes for a CyberCleanUp, focused on data cleaning, to the World Cleanup Day community, who were accustomed to cleaning up nature and were now confined to their homes. The idea spread from France to other countries, like Italy and Switzerland, Poland, the Netherlands, Germany, Brazil, USA, UK, Israel, Croatia, Tunisia, Senegal, Belgium, the Philippines and Indonesia. As of 2023, Digital Cleanup Day has taken place in 122 countries.

In 2021, the global civic organization Let's Do It! World (LDIW), an accredited member of the United Nations Environment Programme, included this project in its annual plans and set the third Saturday of March as the annual date. In 2023 the Cyber World Cleanup Day changed its name to Digital Cleanup Day.

== Environmental impacts ==
Initially, it was thought that the digital age would benefit the environment by reducing paper consumption. However, the carbon footprint of the digital industry has increased as digital consumption grows exponentially.

The French Environment and Energy Management Agency (ADEME) estimated in its 2019 study, The hidden face of digital, that the digital sector was responsible for 4% of total greenhouse gas (GHG) emissions, a figure that could double by 2025 with the significant increase in digital use. According to the Global Energy & CO_{2} Status Report 2019 by the International Energy Agency, the internet and its supporting systems produce 900 million tons of CO_{2} every year, which is more than the annual emissions of the whole of Germany. The internet might consume 20% of the world's total energy by 2030.

"Deleting an email is like turning the water off while you brush your teeth," as Caroline Donnelly from Computer Weekly puts it. However, online videos account for the largest share of global data streams, namely 80%. All data on the internet, even when it is not being used, must be kept available 24/7 by data centers all over the world and therefore consumes energy and cooling water even when inactive.

The main objective of the Digital Cleanup Day is to limit the environmental impacts caused by the increasing use of digital technologies. It encourages all actors in the area to delete unnecessary computer files, emails, unused applications, and old conversation histories on social networks, and to give a second life to digital equipment by opting for repair or reuse.

== National initiatives independent of the global project ==
=== Estonia ===
- Telia Estonia's Digital Cleanup Day, since 2019

=== USA ===
- National Clean Out Your Computer Day, every 2nd Monday in February since 2000

=== Canada ===
- National Clean Out Your Virtual Desktop Day, every 3rd Monday of October since 2010

== See also ==
- Let's Do It! World
- World Cleanup Day
