= Let's do it! Armenia =

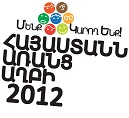
- Founded: 2012
- Type: Volunteer movement
- Location: Armenia
- Origins: Young Biologists Association NGO Let's do it! World campaign
- Website: http://www.letsdoit.am

Let's do it! Armenia is a movement in Armenia, based upon the Let's Do It! World international ecological movement. In 2012, from 24 March until 25 September, the movement aimed to carry out the Pan-Armenian volunteer initiative "Armenia Without Garbage" which involved a number of activities (Pan-Armenian cleanup campaign, seminars etc.).The basis of the worldwide movement "Let's Do It! World" is the big cleanup (Let's do it! 2008) organized in Estonia in 2008, during which more than 50 000 volunteers were able to clean up Estonia from 10 000 tons of waste.

== Participation ==
All the individuals and organizations which worry about the ecological problems of Armenia and can make a contribution on a voluntary basis within the framework of the movement were welcome to take part in this campaign. They called everyone (individuals, ecological, youth and other organizations, schools, HEIs) to join the movement, coordinate and carry out clean-up and educational activities in their favorite places.

== Armenia Without Garbage ==
Let's do it! Armenia was going to unite and carry out the biggest Pan-Armenian clean-up under the slogan "Armenia Without Garbage" on 15 September 2012.

The initiative aimed to unite everybody's strength in order to clean Armenia's nature and historical and cultural sites from waste in a day with joint efforts. In order to raise the awareness among society, they also planned to organize educational and informational activities about waste sorting and recycling during the campaign.

== Partners ==
- Let's Do It! World
- Aarhus Centers
- Acopian Center for the Environment
- Association of Young Journalists NGO
- Armat Press Club
- Anania Shirakatsi Armenian National Lyce'e
- Armenian Society for the Protection of Birds
- ArmYouth.am
- Armenian Environmental Network
- Armenia Tree Project
- Consumers Support Center
- Eritasard.am
- Econews.am
- HotTv
- "Hetq" Online Newspaper
- Kanachastan NGO
- Life Colors ecological NGO
- Lyunse youth radio program
- Max Liberty radio program
- "Ohanyan" Educational Complex
- "Poqrik Ishkhan" Educational Complex
- Tapan Eco-Club
- The Student Council of Armenian Diaspora
- The Laboratory
- Yeghvard Youth Environmental NGO
- Youth Union of Environmental Economists
- WWF Armenia

== See also ==
Let's do it! 2008
