= Let's Clean Slovenia in One Day! =

2010 environment cleanup program

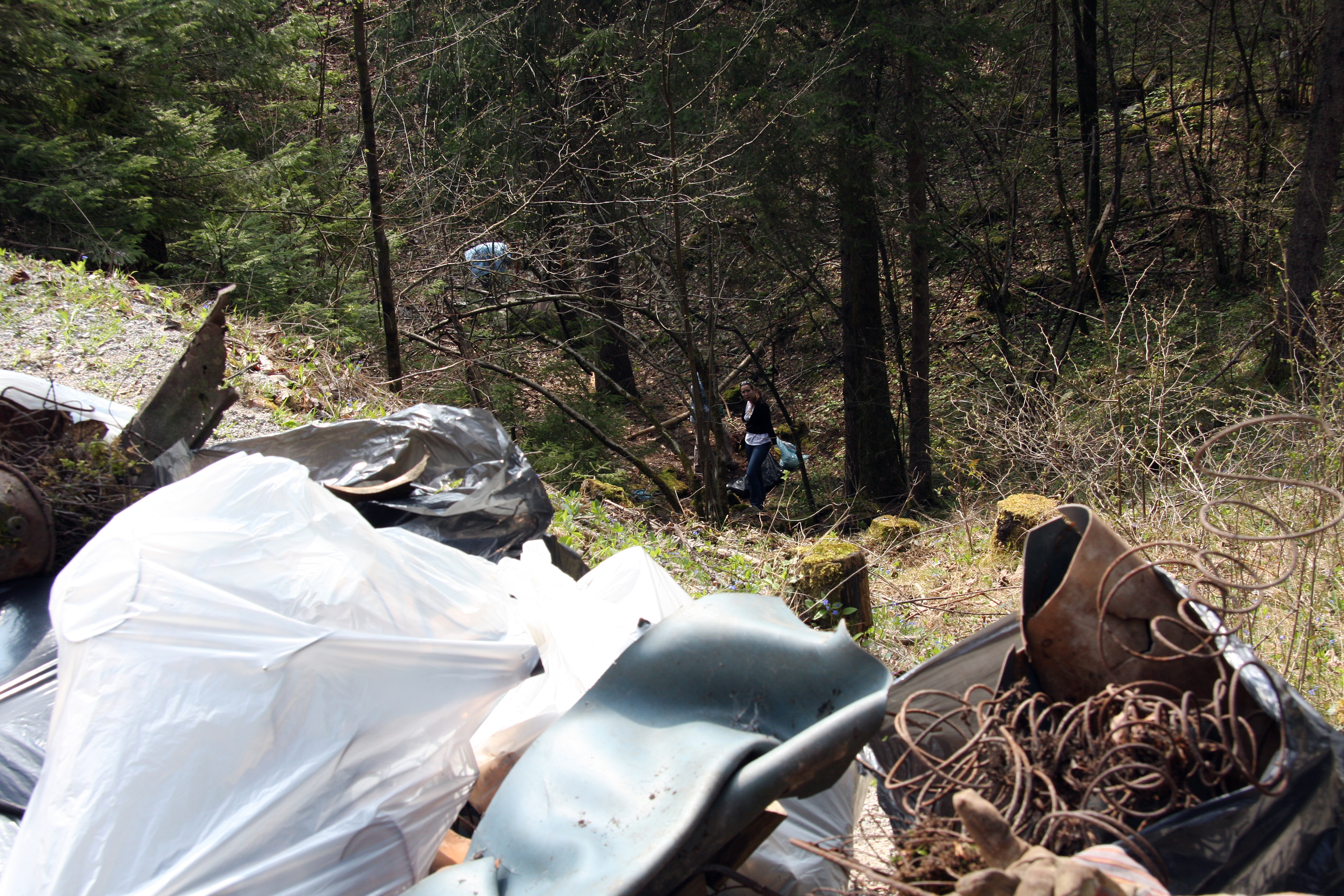
Volunteers cleaning a sinkhole dump near Verd during the event

Let's Clean Slovenia in One Day! (Slovene: Očistimo Slovenijo v enem dnevu!; OSVED!) was a Slovenian environmental volunteer project organized by the environmental organization Ecologists Without Borders on 17 April 2010. Its goal was carrying out the largest environmental act in the history of Slovenia by joining 200,000 volunteers which would remove at least 20,000 tons of municipal waste from illegal landfills in the country. Cleaning of scattered garbage in urban areas was also organized. The project was inspired by the Estonian campaign Let's Do It 2008.

In the months before the event, momentum was built up by various promotional and organizational activities. A large-scale inventory of illegal landfills was performed with the help of Slovene mapping service Geopedia. 115,000 such landfills were registered, containing an estimated 100,000 cubic metres (3,500,000 cu ft) of waste. In this phase, several other organizations joined the effort, such as the Administration for Civic Protection and Disaster Relief, Department of Geography at the Faculty of Arts (University of Ljubljana) and others. Around 300 members of the Slovenian Armed Forces participated in the experimental cleanup a week before the main event to sort out logistical problems.

According to official data, around 105,000 people from all Slovene municipalities applied by the end of initial period of registration on 10 April, which was later extended to until the day of the event. Removal of 80,000 cubic metres (2,800,000 cu ft) of waste was planned; the remaining content of the inventoried landfills was hazardous waste or demolition waste. Such waste was not to be cleaned, only noted for informing the officials.

On the day of the event, around 270,000 volunteers, or more than 13% of the Slovenian population participated, making Let's Clean Slovenia in One Day! the largest civic initiative in the history of independent Slovenia and setting the world record. They removed 60,000 cubic metres (2,100,000 cu ft), or 12,000 tons of waste from 7000 landfills. For this achievement, Ecologists Without Borders were awarded the Order of Merit of Slovenia by the president Danilo Türk.

== See also ==
- Let's Clean Slovenia 2012
- Let's Do It! World
