= Rainer Nõlvak =

Estonian businessman

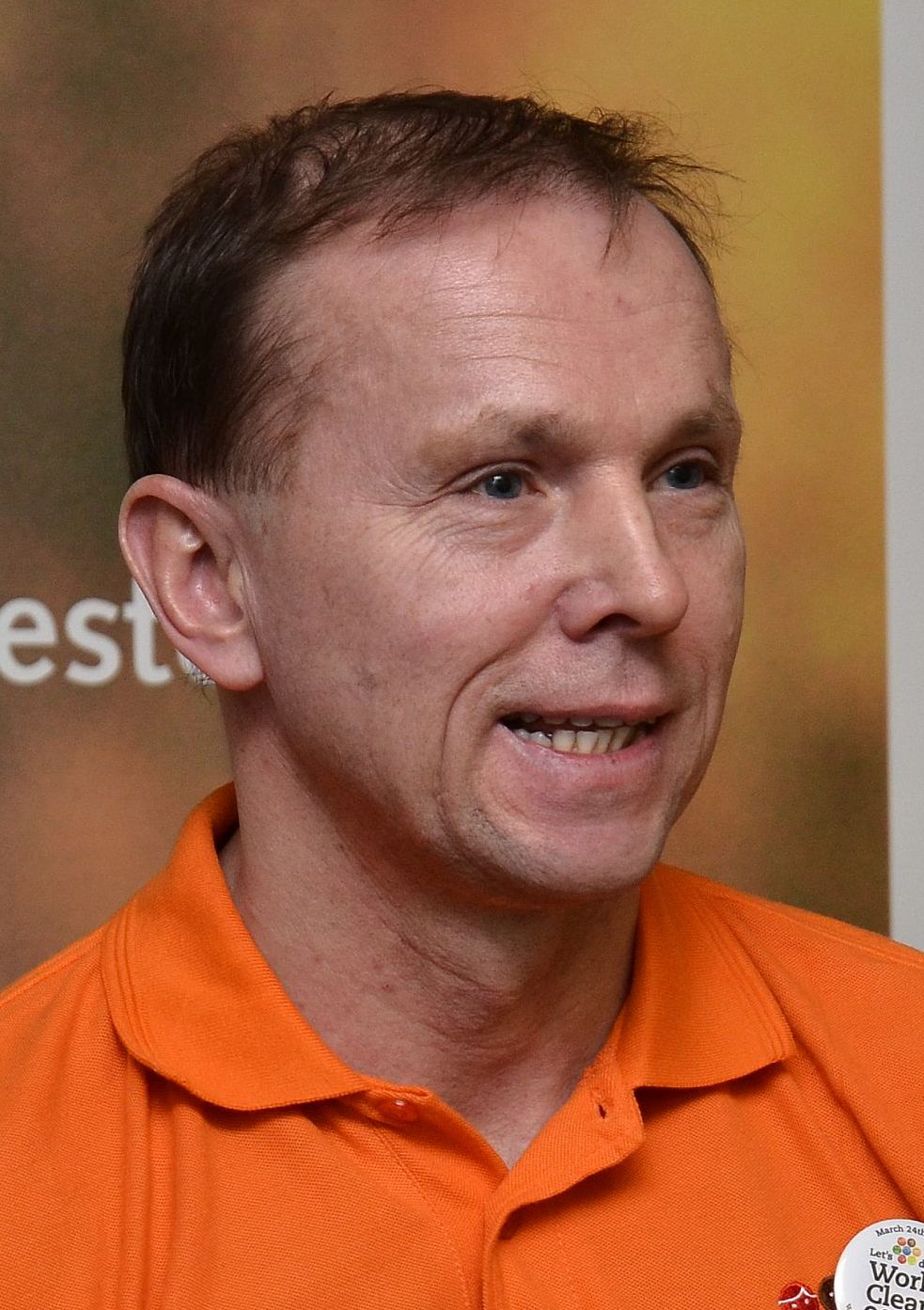
Rainer Nõlvak in 2012.

Rainer Nõlvak (born September 28, 1966) is an Estonian entrepreneur and the initiator of the largest civic movement in history.

He is the initiator of Let's Do It 2008, a civic action with 50,000 volunteers (4% of the population of Estonia) participating in cleaning up the country in one day. For this he was awarded the title of the Citizen of the Year in 2008 and received 2008 Estonian Volunteer of the Year national award. The movement has grown into the global Let's Do It! World action, happening annually. Let’s Do It! World has since engaged 114,000,000 participants (1.4% of global population), from 211 countries and territories (which includes 95% of UN member states) and is named the biggest civic action movement in human history. In 2023 United Nations unanimously adopted resolution 78/122 “World Cleanup Day”, which proclaims 20th September as World Cleanup Day.

Rainer Nõlvak has advocated for the Estonian energy industry to move away from oil shale and move towards renewable energy systems. He has published the "Green Energy" program.

Rainer Nõlvak founded the following companies: MicroLink (the largest computer manufacturer in the Baltics), Curonia Research, Celecure, Docobo, Spacedrip, Kodea.

He was awarded the Order of the White Star 3rd Class of Estonia in 2014.

He is a former chairman of the board of the Estonian Nature Fund.
