= Volunteer of the Year =

Volunteer of the Year may refer to:

- Estonian Volunteer of the Year
- NFCB Volunteer of the Year, by National Federation of Community Broadcasters
- Online Volunteer of the Year, by United Nations Volunteers
