= Let's Clean Slovenia 2012 =

2012 environmental cleanup program

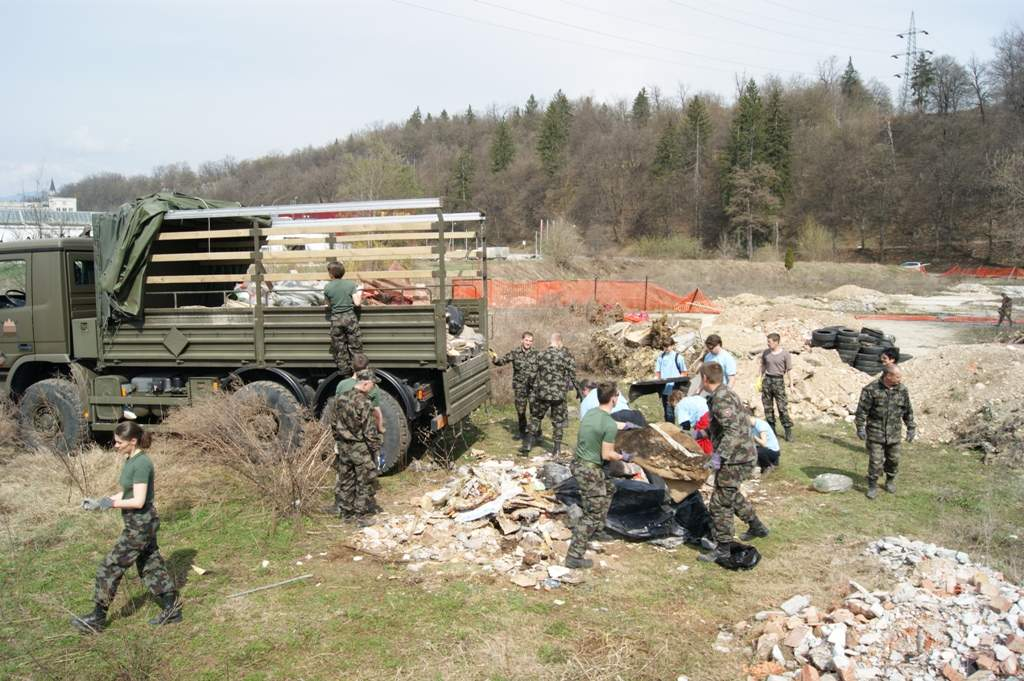
Slovenian soldiers participating in cleaning

Let's Clean Slovenia 2012 (Slovene: Očistimo Slovenijo 2012) was a Slovenian environmental volunteer project organized by the environmental organization Ecologists Without Borders with the goal of joining 250,000 people on 24 March 2012 and cleaning municipal waste from illegal landfills in the country. Cleaning of scattered garbage in urban areas was also organized. The project, a continuation of the Let's Clean Slovenia in One Day! carried out two years before, was inspired by the Estonian campaign Let's Do It 2008 and organized within the frame of the World Cleanup 2012.

The work started in March 2011 and culminated in the all-Slovenian cleanup on 24 March 2012. Around 121,000 people applied until a few days before the event, with official support from almost all Slovene municipalities. Data from the inventory of illegal landfills created in collaboration with Slovene mapping service Geopedia was used in directing volunteers towards landfills.

Among the participants were the Slovenian Army, top Slovene politicians, celebrities, and Rainer Nõlvak, the main motivator of the movement Let's Do It! World. President of Slovenia Danilo Türk acted as an honorary patron, and the folk-rock musician Vlado Kreslin responded to a request and wrote the song "Okna na stežaj" that became an official hymn of the event.

The World Cleanup 2012 initiative, which was started on that day by Portugal and Slovenia, will continue with clean-up actions in over 80 countries until September 2012. Over 270,000 people or 12% of the population participated in Slovenia. 5000 tons of waste were picked up.

== See also ==
- Let's Clean Slovenia in One Day!
