= Do It Again =

Do It Again may refer to:

== Film ==
- Do It Again (film), 2010 documentary directed by Robert Patton-Spruill

== Music ==
=== Albums ===
- Do It Again (Gabrielle album), 2021
- Do It Again (EP), by Röyksopp and Robyn,, 2014

=== Songs ===
- "Do It Again" (Benee song), featuring Mallrat, 2023
- "Do It Again" (Cassie Davis song), 2009
- "Do It Again" (Elevation Worship song), 2016
- "Do It Again" (George Gershwin and Buddy DeSylva song), 1922
- "Do It Again" (NLE Choppa song), featuring 2Rare, 2022
- "Do It Again" (Pia Mia song), featuring Chris Brown and Tyga, 2015
- "Do It Again" (Röyksopp and Robyn song), 2014
- "Do It Again" (Steely Dan song), 1972
- "Do It Again" (Swami song), 2014
- "Do It Again" (The Beach Boys song), 1968
- "Do It Again" (The Chemical Brothers song), 2007
- "Do It Again" (The Kinks song), 1984
- "Do It Again (Put Ya Hands Up)", by Jay-Z, 1999
- "Do It Again", written by Irving Berlin, 1912
- "Do It Again", by Air Supply from The Whole Thing's Started, 1977
- "Do It Again", by Chris Brown from Fortune, 2012
- "Do It Again", by Holy Ghost! from Holy Ghost!, 2011
- "Do It Again", by Israel Cruz, 2007
- "Do It Again", by Kylie Minogue, a B-side of the singles "In My Arms" and "Wow", 2008
- "Do It Again", by Lil Boosie from Incarcerated, 2010
- "Do It Again", by No Rome, 2018
- "Do It Again", by Queens of the Stone Age from Songs for the Deaf, 2002
- "Do It Again", by R5 from Sometime Last Night, 2015
- "Do It Again", by Ray Dalton, 2023
- "Do It Again", by Status Quo from Heavy Traffic, 2002
- "Do It Again", by the Ting Tings from Super Critical, 2014

== See also ==
- Did It Again (disambiguation)
- Do That Again (disambiguation)
- Let's Do It Again (disambiguation)
