= Let's Do It! India =

Indian non profit organization

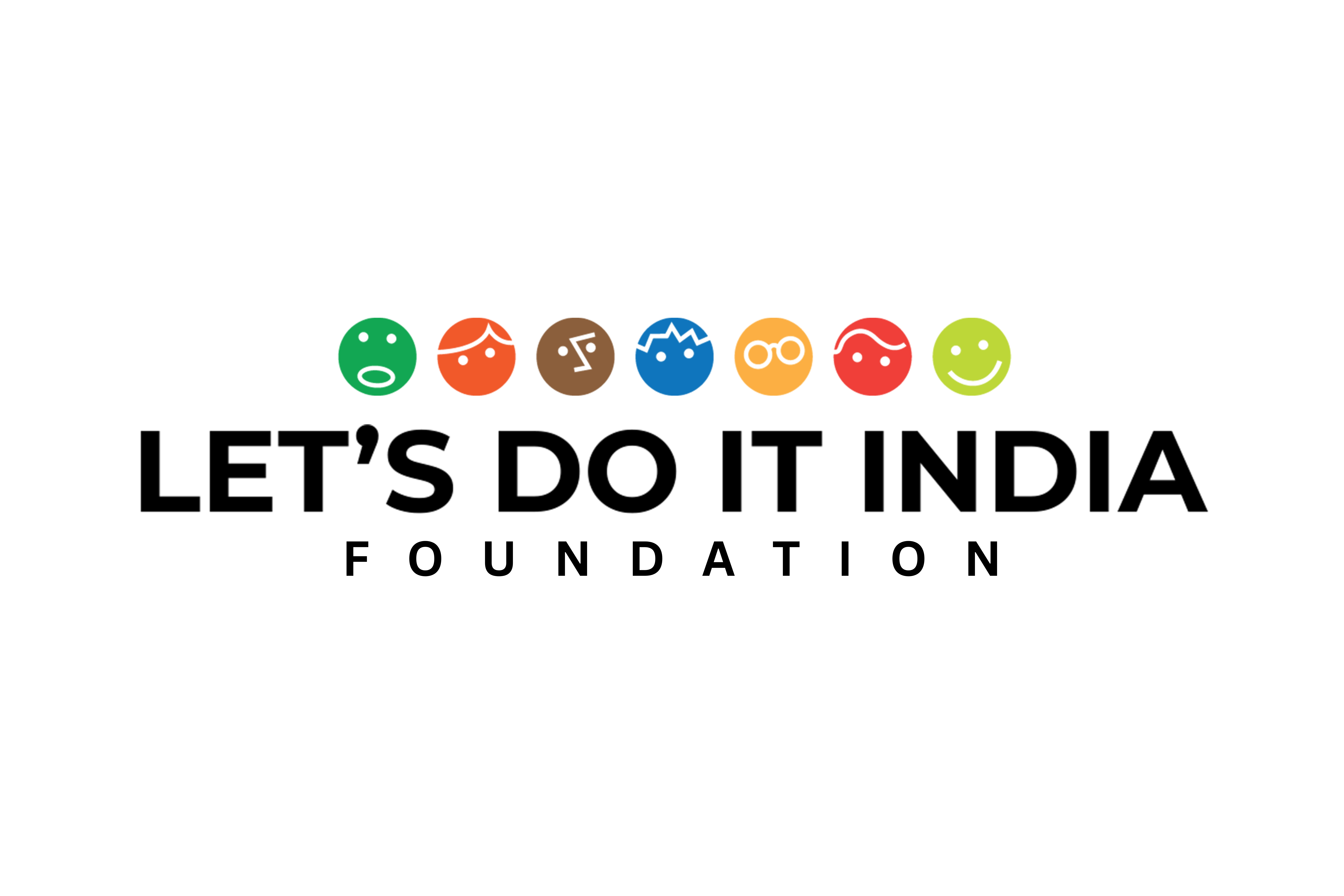
Let's Do It India Logo

Let's Do It! India (LDII) is an International Environmental Organization founded by Pankaj Choudhary in 2016. It has more than 2.2 Million active volunteers all across the country. Let's Do It! India encourages people all across the world to participate in local, governmental, and international cleanup efforts. It is a section 8 non profit company registered under India's company's act with required 12A and 80G section.

The organization works in the fields of education, environment, healthcare, human resource development, etc.

== Activities ==
Let's Do It India is aiming to raise awareness of the many types of garbage. In 2020 the organization launched a campaign 'Pickup Cigarette Butts!' on World Cleanup Day. It encourages people to gather and send their used cigarette filters to the group for recycling.

In 2020, National Green Tribunal (India) has instructed the Central Pollution Control Board (CPCB) to develop rules for the disposal of bidi residues and cigarette butts. In the same year Let's Do It India started a campaign of collecting cigarette butts and bidi residues under the guidelines of Central Pollution Control Board. This movement is supported by the International organizations like UN-Habitat, United Nations Environment Programme and Earth Day Network. The organization collects tons of garbage on World Cleanup Day each year.

In 2022, a MoU was signed between Ministry of Water Resources, River Development and Ganga Rejuvenation and Let's Do It India.

With the help of more than 30,000 volunteers, the HCL Foundation and Let's Do It India organization held World Cleanup Day 2022 at Noida, India.

== See also ==
- World Cleanup Day
