= Chamber Choir Head Ööd, Vend =

Estonian choir

- Choir
- Origin: Tallinn, Estonia
- Founded: March 2008

Chamber Choir Head Ööd, Vend is an Estonian chamber choir. The chief conductor of the choir is the Estonian composer Pärt Uusberg.

The choir got its start in March 2008, when Pärt Uusberg called together a project choir to take part in his brother's Uku Uusberg's diploma production "Good night, Brother" (in Estonian "Head ööd, Vend"), based on William Shakespeare. After the last performance in autumn 2008, the desire to sing together had not waned and a decision was made to continue as a regular choir.

The core of the choir consists of singers who grew up together singing in Rapla Riinimanda choirs, conducted by Urve Uusberg, along with friends from the Estonian Youth Mixed Choir and young music students. The choir has been a laboratory for the young conductor and composer since its beginnings and still performs a lot of Uusberg's music.

The choir has given many concerts in Rapla, Tallinn, Tartu and other Estonian churches and also in Gotland at the St. Mary's Cathedral in Visby. Additionally, the choir has participated in the theatre NO99 plays "Pea vahetus" ("Head exchange") and "Ühtne Eesti suurkogu" ("Unified Estonia plenum"). In 2014 Chamber Choir Head Ööd, Vend was one of the main performers at the Vaasa Choir Festival in Finland. In 2015 the choir collaborated with the Estonian Dance Agency in the music and dance performance "Estonian Images".

Chamber Choir Head Ööd, Vend received in 2013 the honor of being named “Choir of the Year” by the Estonian Choral Association. The same year, the choir's newest album "Õhtul" ("In the Evening") was named “Album of the Year”.

== Awards ==
- 2013 – 6th place and silver medal in XX century music category, silver medal in Contemporary music category and 5th place and gold medal in Gospel, jazz and folk music category, 52nd International Choir Competition “Seghizzi”
- 2013 – Grand Prix, I prize in Chamber choir category and II prize in Contemporary music category, XIII International Choir Competition “Tallinn 2013”
- 2013 – I prize A-category and the traveling trophy of “Tuljak” for the best “Tuljak” performance, XIX Estonian Mixed Choirs’ Competition “Tuljak”
- 2012 – II prize A-category, granted an access to the Grand Prix round, XII Estonian Chamber Choirs’ Festival
- 2011 – II prize A-category, XVIII Estonian Mixed Choirs’ Competition “Tuljak”
- 2010 – Golden diploma, VIII Pärnu International Choir Festival
- 2009 – III prize in Chamber choir category in XI International Choir Competition
- 2009 – I prize B-category, XVII Estonian Mixed Choirs’ Competition “Tuljak”

== Acknowledgements ==
- Estonian Choral Association's Choir of the Year 2013
- Estonian Choral Association's Album of the Year 2013 (for "Õhtul)

== Recordings ==
- Siis vaikivad kõik mõtted (2009)
- Õhtul (2013)
- Õhtu ilu (2016, with the orchestra Collegium Consonante)
