= Green Office =

Sustainability department or office

A Green Office (in some cases also called Student Green Office, (Student) Green Unit, Sustainability Hub, or Nachhaltigkeitsbüro (German)) is a sustainability department or office that enables students and other actors such as academics and staff to act on sustainability at their university. The model differs from other approaches of sustainability governance, as it allows students to actively contribute to their university’s sustainability efforts. Through its institutional mandate, funding and support, a Green Office addresses common barriers which prevent sustainability student groups from having more of an impact on their university.

The first Green Office was established at Maastricht University in 2010 as the institution’s student-run sustainability department. The model has since spread to over 50 higher education institutions in various countries, mainly in Europe. It is particularly popular in the Netherlands, where most of the universities have established a Green Office. The model is actively being spread by the social business Green Office Movement (previously known as rootAbility) and is freely available under a Creative Commons License.

== Activities and achievements ==
Green Offices focus on embedding sustainability into the education, research and operations of their university or on supporting sustainability student engagement. For example, Maastricht, Magdeburg and Konstanz are engaged in writing sustainability reports, strategies and policies for their university. Others, such as Groningen, Utrecht and Rotterdam are more focused on student engagement through lectures, movie screenings or workshops.

Some notable achievements of Green Offices include:

- Contributing to achieving the Fair-Trade University Status (Eindhoven).
- Creating a sustainability minor and honours programme (VU Amsterdam).
- Increasing the recycling rate of E-waste by 185% (Maastricht).
- Getting an online course accredited (Konstanz).
- Initiating the development of a university-wide sustainability vision (Leiden).

== Characteristics ==
An analysis of 23 Green Offices concluded that the average Green Office has 5 student employees who are paid for 9 hours a week and typically work another 5 hours voluntarily. The Green Office either consists of only students who actively work with staff at the institution or of students and staff in one core team. Every second Green Offices works with volunteers. Typically, a Green Office working with volunteers will manage 20 volunteers at a time.

70% of Green Offices possess their own office space, whereas 30% share office space. Green Offices are officially recognized and resourced by their Executive Board, a (sustainability) committee or Facility Services. The average overall annual budget is 60,000 EUR. Some Green Offices also have supervisory boards to which they report.

== Green Office Movement ==
Existing Green Offices are part of the “Green Office Movement”. The movement organizes a yearly European Green Office Summit, as well as a Learning, Exchange and Action Programme hosting knowledge exchange throughout the year. On a national level, the movement is supported by Studenten voor Morgen in the Netherlands, Netzwerk N in Germany and the National Union of Students in the United Kingdom.

== Risks and recognition ==
A recurring issue Green Offices have faced is a lack of continuity given the high turnover of student employees. Green Offices also have limited authority within the university and rely on academics, staff and higher management to work with them. In addition, a Green Office may reduce the responsibility that other actors at the university feel to act on sustainability.

The Green Office Model has received numerous recognitions including the International Student Campus Network Award for excellence in student projects and the UNESCO-Japan Prize on Education for Sustainable Development. The committee for the UNESCO-Japan prize claims that "this intense collaboration and inclusive participation have ensured the best conditions for the necessary changes towards sustainability".
