= Andres Luure =

Estonian philosopher and Wikipedian

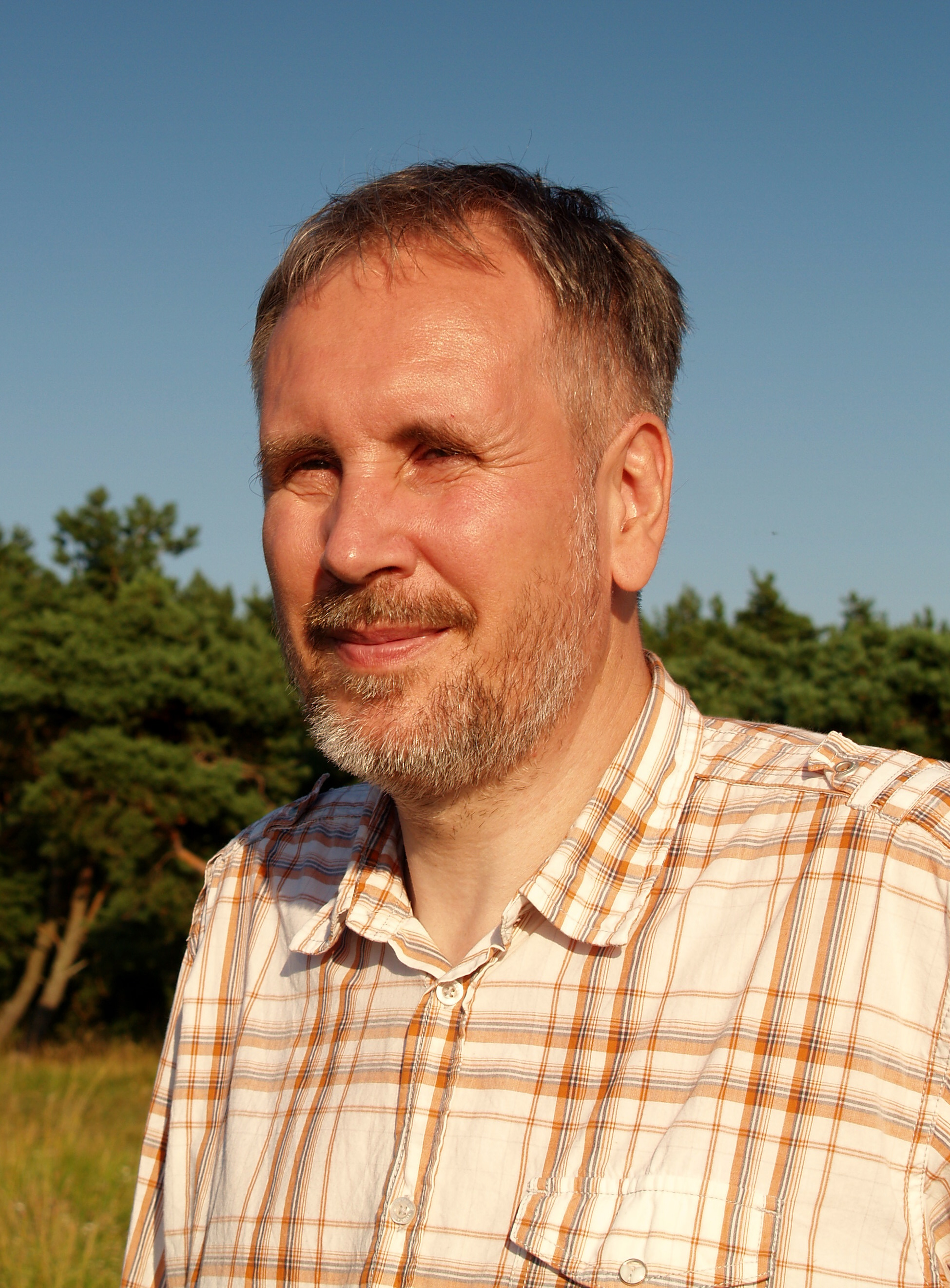
Andres Luure

Andres Luure (born 22 May 1959, in Tallinn) is an Estonian philosopher and translator, and a researcher at Tallinn University.

Luure graduated from the Moscow State University in 1983, majoring in mathematics. In 1998, he successfully defended his MA thesis titled "A combinatorial model of referring" from the Tallinn Pedagogical University. In 2006, he successfully defended his Ph. D. thesis titled "Duality and sextets: a new structure of categories" in semiotics at the University of Tartu.

Luure has translated philosophical works into Estonian, including titles by Ludwig Wittgenstein, Jürgen Habermas and Gilbert Ryle.

== Recognition ==
In 2008, Luure was recognised by Estonian Volunteering Development Centre as the Volunteer of the Year for his contribution to the Estonian Wikipedia. He received the Order of the White Star, 5th Class in 2013 for his contribution to the Estonian Wikipedia.
