= Pärt Uusberg =

Estonian composer and conductor

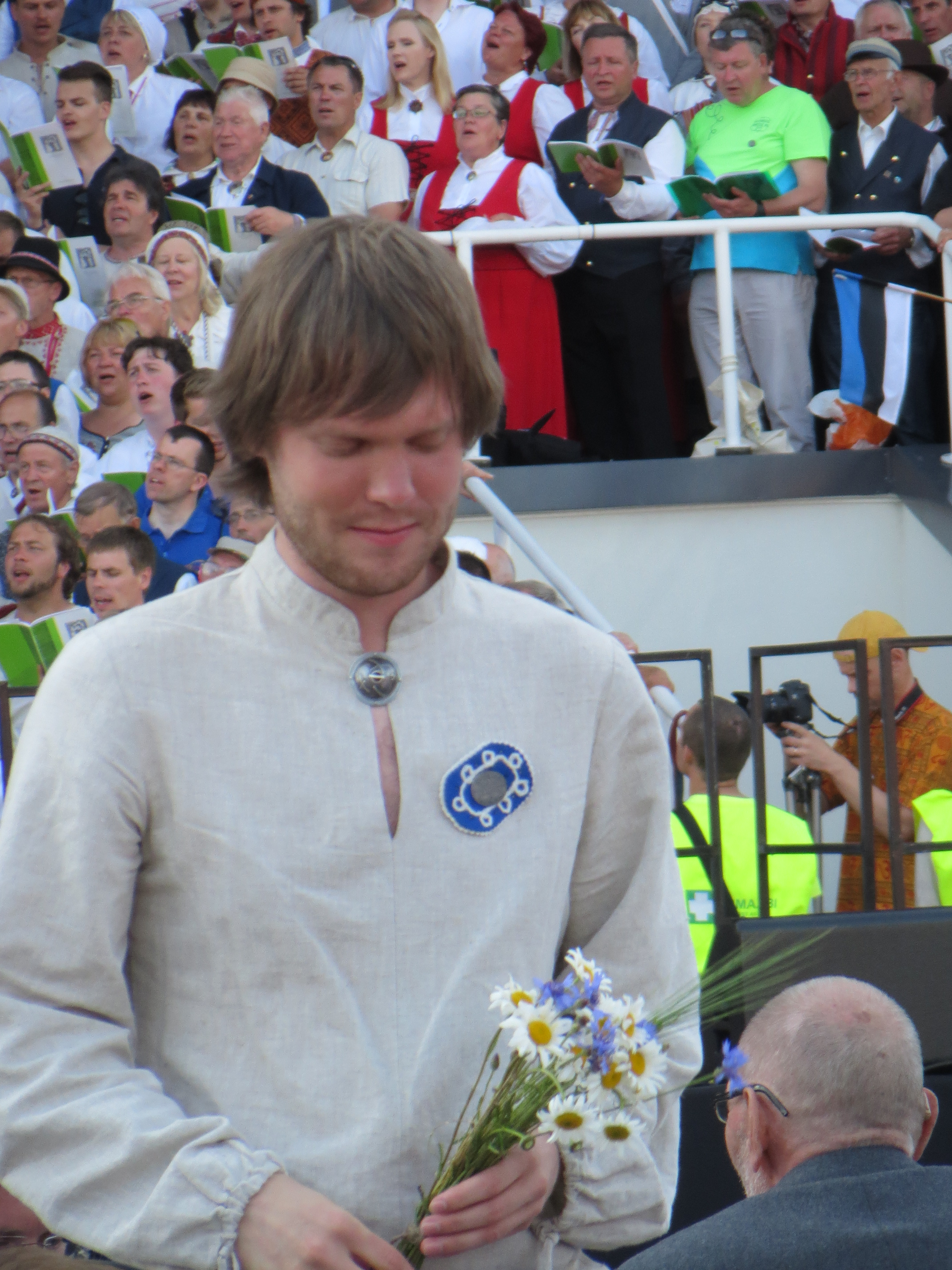
Pärt Uusberg at the XXVI Estonian Song Festival (2014)

Pärt Uusberg (born 16 December 1986) is an Estonian composer, conductor, and actor. He is the chief conductor of Chamber Choir Head Ööd, Vend. He played Joosep in the film The Class.

Uusberg was born in Rapla. He has two brothers - Uku Uusberg is an actor and Andero Uusberg is a psychologist. His father Valter Uusberg is an animation director and mother Urve Uusberg is also a conductor and a psychologist.

His choral music has been described as "approachable (yet often viscerally powerful)".

== Selected filmography ==
- Risttuules (2014) (composer)
- Oleg (2010)
- Klass (2007)
