= Uno Aan =

Estonian historian and local figure

- Born: 1936 (age 89–90)
- Occupations: local history enthuasiast, local cultural and sport figure

Uno Aan (born in 1936) is an Estonian local historian and a local cultural and sports figure. His work and activities are related to Järva County.

== Awards ==
- 2008: Estonian Volunteer of the Year
- 2012: Order of the White Star, Fifth Class
