= Did It Again =

Did It Again may refer to:

- "Did It Again" (Kylie Minogue song), 1997
- "Did It Again" (Shakira song), 2009
- "Did It Again" (Lil Tecca song), 2019

== See also ==
- Do It Again (disambiguation)
