= UNESCO-Japan Prize on Education for Sustainable Development =

The UNESCO-Japan Prize on Education for Sustainable Development is a UNESCO award of USD 150,000 awarded annually to three individuals or organizations for projects in favour of education for sustainable development (ESD). The award was established in 2014 by the Executive Board of UNESCO at the initiative of the government of Japan, as part of the UNESCO Global Action Programme on ESD (GAP). The prize winners are selected by a jury consisting of international members, and the Director-General of UNESCO appoints the jury, which meets annually in Paris, France.

The prize is awarded at a ceremony at UNESCO Headquarters in Paris. The first prize was awarded in November 2015 by Director-General Irina Bokova

Nominations for the prize can be submitted by Member States of UNESCO or Non-Governmental Organizations in official partnership for UNESCO each year.

Since October 2019, the prize will be delivered once every two years

== Criteria ==
In order to be eligible for the prize, individuals or organizations have to:

The official criteria for assessment are

- Transformation: use education to support sustainable development, leading to individual and social change.
- Integration: address the three dimensions of sustainable development (economy, society, environment).
- Innovation: demonstrate an innovative and imaginative approach to education for sustainable development.

Other mentioned criteria for selection are: contribution to the Global Action Programme on ESD, and impact and replicability of the project

== Prize winners ==
The first winners of the prize were announced in September 2015. To date, one laureate comes from Latin America, one from Europe and one from Asia and the Pacific.

=== 2015 ===
- Germany: rootAbility / Green Office Movement
- Guatemala/El Salvador: Asociación SERES
- Indonesia: The Centre for Development of Early Childhood, Non-Formal and Informal Education (Jayagiri Centre)

=== 2016 ===
The three winners of 2016 were:

- Cameroon: Centre for Community Regeneration and Development
- Japan: Okayama ESD Promotion Commission
- United Kingdom: National Union of Students UK

=== 2017 ===
The three winners of 2017 were:

- Jordan: Zikra for Popular Learning
- United Kingdom: Hard Rain Project
- Zimbabwe: Sihlengeni Primary School

=== 2018 ===
The three winners of 2018 were:

- Namibia: Namib Desert Environmental Education Trust
- Indonesia: Kalabia Foundation
- Estonia: Let's Do It! World

=== 2019 ===
The three winners of 2019 were:

- Botswana: Camphill Community Trust
- Brazil: Sustainable Amazon Foundation
- Germany: Hamburg
