= World Cleanup Day =

Global social-action program

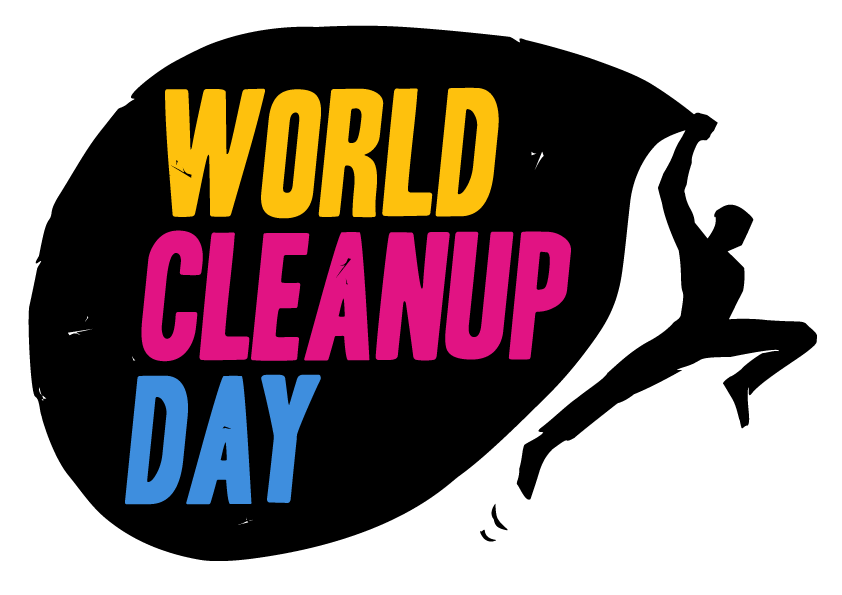
- Date: 20 September
- Frequency: Annually
- Location: Worldwide
- Years active: 8
- Inaugurated: 15 September 2018; 8 years ago
- Participants: (25000000) (2021)
- Budget: ~$1 million
- Website: www.worldcleanupday.org

World Cleanup Day is a global social action program aimed at combating the global solid waste problem, including the problem of marine debris. It is held annually on 20 September, and is coordinated by the global organization Let's Do It! World, whose headquarters are located in Tallinn, Estonia.

World Cleanup Day includes litter cleanup and waste mapping activities spanning every time zone. Environmental cleanup events are held in nearly every country until concluding near the international date line in Hawaii and American Samoa. On 8 December 2023, World Cleanup Day was declared an official UN holiday starting in 2024, and added to the official UN calendar of days and weeks.

== Purpose ==
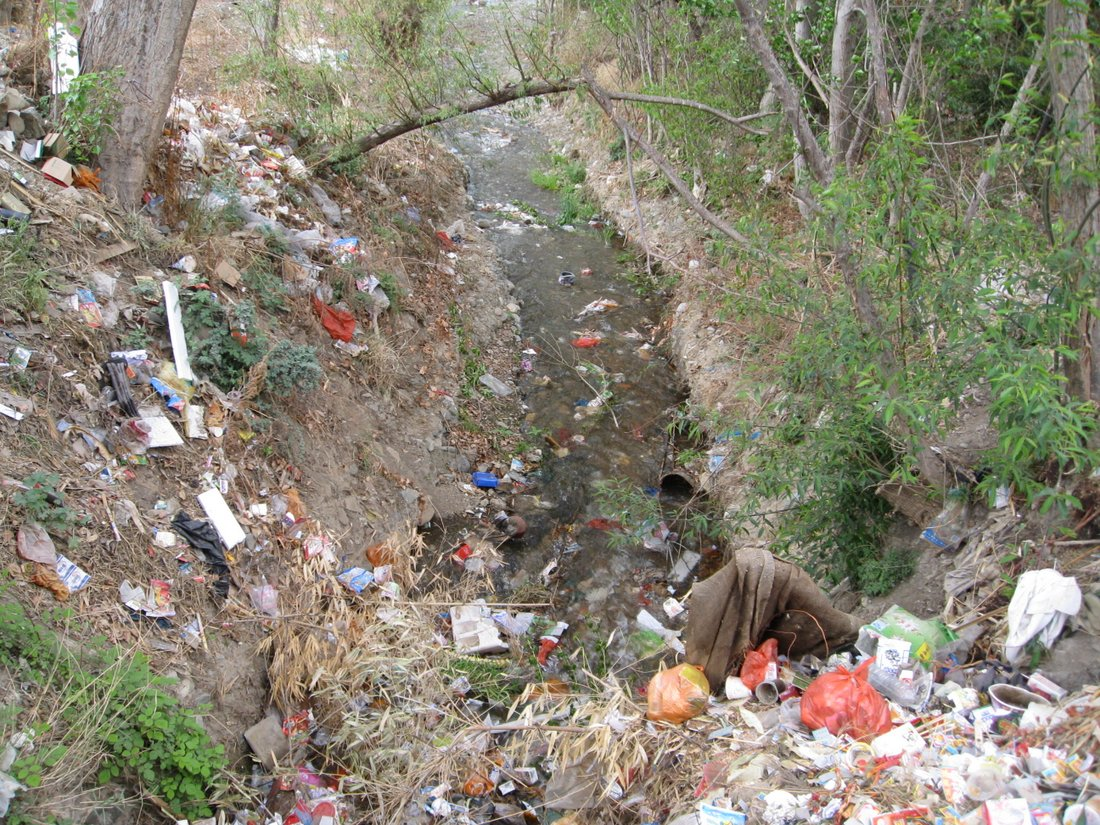
An example of the pollution that World Clean Up Day aims to clean up

World Cleanup Day aims to raise awareness of the mismanaged waste crisis by mobilizing all spheres of society to participate in cleanup actions. Individuals, governments, corporations and organizations are all encouraged to take part in cleanups and to find solutions to tackle mismanaged waste. There are numerous organizations that facilitate and host World Cleanup Day events globally. Like Earth Day, World Cleanup Day is non-partisan, apolitical, and is not affiliated with any national or global political party or discrete ideology.

== History ==
The inaugural World Cleanup Day was 15 September 2018, but it builds on the successes of previous global cleanup efforts. The goal of World Cleanup Day 2018 was to involve 5% of the world's population (or approximately 380 million people). While the effort fell short of the goal, it directly mobilized 18 million people worldwide.

The 2019 World Cleanup Day was held on the 19th of September and coincided with Peace Day and the Global climate strike of September 2019.

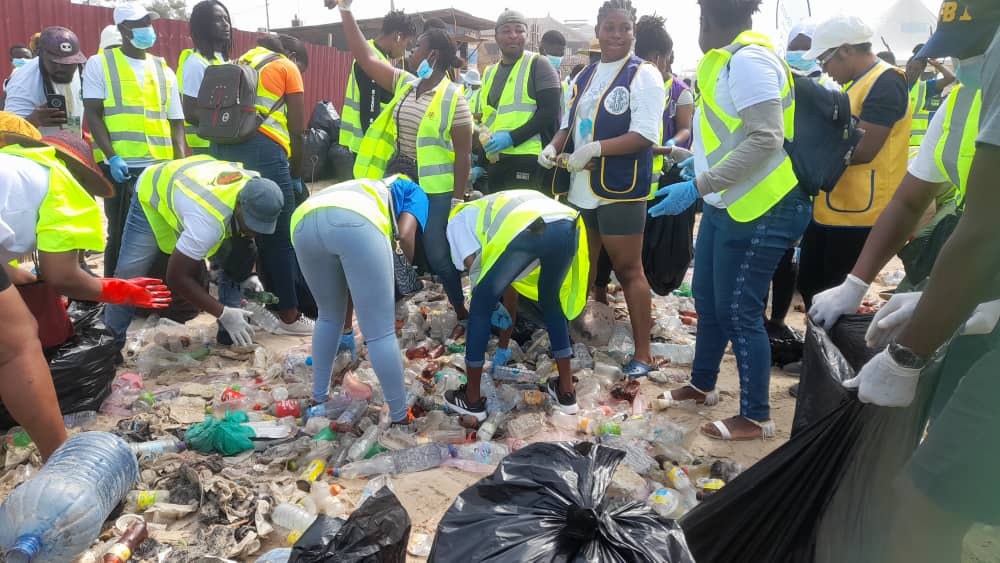
World Cleanup Day in Ghana 2023

Global cleanup efforts have existed in many forms throughout human history, especially after widespread catastrophes such as earthquakes, floods, and powerful tsunamis.

In modern history, these efforts are typically undertaken by the affected communities, with support from various international organizations and NGOs, such as Red Cross, Oxfam, and other relief organizations but typically in post-conflict zones. They have included efforts to remove land mines, beach cleanups, and other municipal and non-governmental actions.

Since 2020 there also exists a Digital Cleanup Day. Initially known as Cyber World Cleanup Day, this day of action aims to draw attention to digital ecological footprints and the associated environmental impact.

== Participants ==
Participants in World Cleanup Days are typically volunteers, with coordination from non-governmental organizations who assist in awareness-raising, logistics, and fundraising.

== See also ==
- Clean-up (environment)
- Let's Do It 2008
- Let's Clean Slovenia in One Day!
- Let's Clean Slovenia 2012
- Earth Day
- National Cleanup Day
- The Ocean Cleanup
- Voluntary ecological year
