= Estonian Wikipedia =

Estonian-language edition of Wikipedia

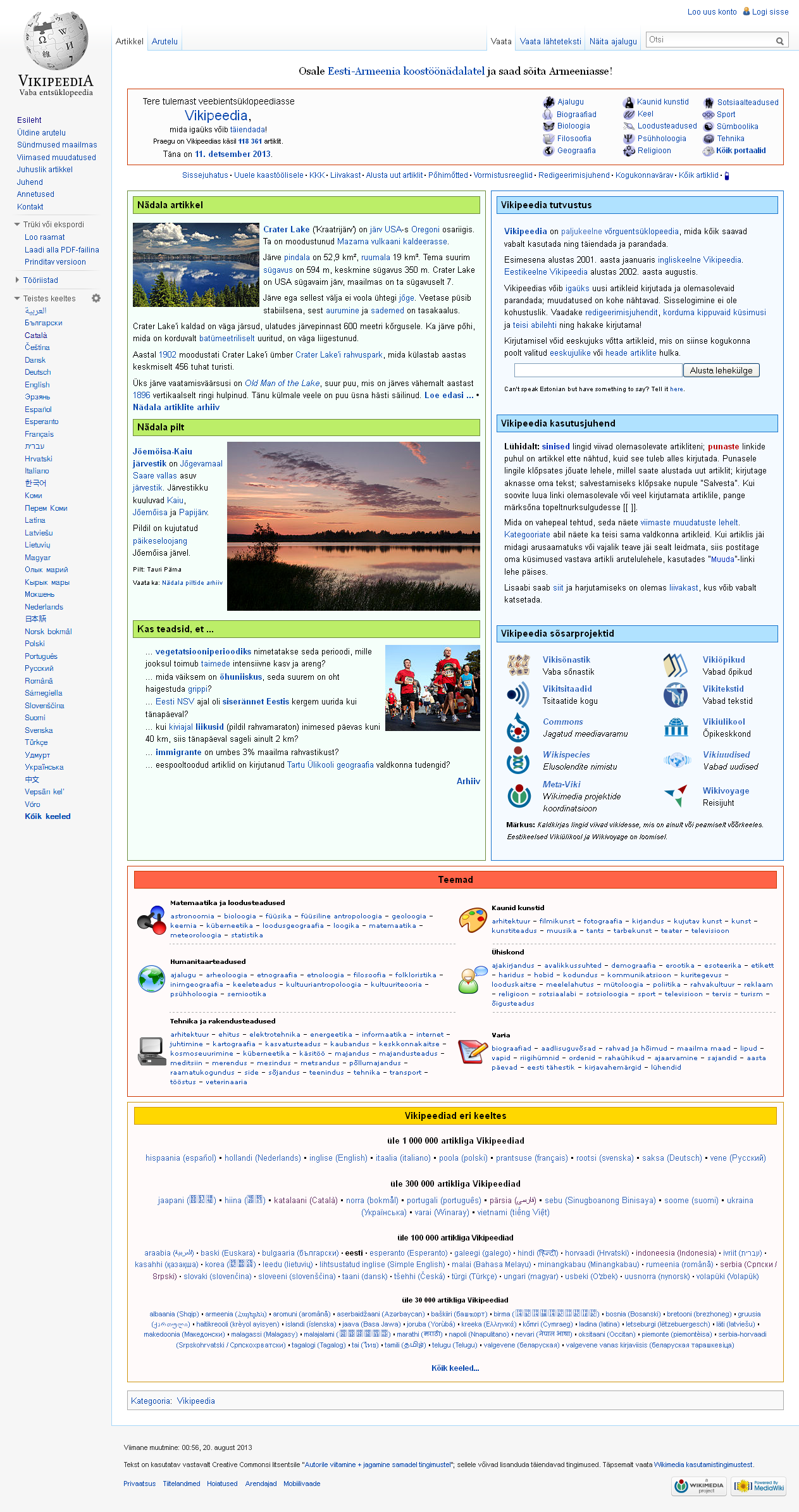
- Main Page of the Estonian Wikipedia in December 2013
- Website type: Internet encyclopedia project
- Available in: Estonian
- Headquarters: Miami, Florida
- Owner: Wikimedia Foundation
- Website: et.wikipedia.org
- Commercial: No
- Registration: Optional
- Launched: 24 August 2002; 24 years ago
- Content license: Creative Commons Attribution/ Share-Alike 4.0 (most text also dual-licensed under GFDL); Media licensing varies

The Estonian Wikipedia (Estonian: Eestikeelne Vikipeedia) is the Estonian version of Wikipedia, the free encyclopedia, which was started on 24 August 2002. As of 19 September 2026, it has 261,972 articles and is the 47th-largest Wikipedia edition.

On 7 December 2008 Estonian Wikipedian Andres Luure was one of fifteen individuals recognized for volunteerism in Estonia for 2008. In 2013 he received Order of the White Star for his contributions to Wikipedia.

The first article competition was held in spring 2009 and first photo competition in summer 2010. Since then those kinds of competitions have been common in Estonian Wikipedia.

As of February 2021, it was the most visited language Wikipedia in Estonia. It ranked before the Russian Wikipedia and the English Wikipedia.

== Statistics ==
Origin of edits (2012/03/01 - 2012/02/28) Source
Estonia	89.7%
Sweden	2.7%
France	2.1%
Ukraine	1.4%
United States	1.4%
Latvia	0.7%
Spain	0.7%
Finland	0.7%
Denmark	0.7%

As of August 2012, The Estonian Wikipedia has the 3rd greatest number of articles per speaker among Wikipedias with over 100,000 articles, and ranks 10th overall. These figures were based on Ethnologue's estimate of 1,048,660 Estonian speakers.

The Estonian Wikipedia is the 41st edition to reach the milestone of 100,000 articles and the third edition in a Uralic language to do so, after the Finnish and Hungarian Wikipedias.

As of August 2012, the Estonian Wikipedia's number of articles accounts for approximately 23% of all the articles written in a Finno-Permic language, making it the second largest edition in the family after Finnish, which accounts for 70% of Finno-Permic articles.

The Estonian Wikipedia has a relatively high percentage of administrators per regular active users (over 9%) compared to the Finnish Wikipedia, where only 2.5% of active users are administrators. As of September 2026, the edition has 974 active contributors and 36 administrators.

The overwhelming majority of its edits originate from Estonia, while a minority of contributions come from neighboring Northern European countries, which account for most of the remaining share of editors.

Articles	Date
100	December 2002
500	September 2003
1,000	October 2003
5,000	July 2004
10,000	15 May 2005
15,000	12 February 2006
20,000	22 July 2006
25,000	30 October 2006
30,000	1 February 2007
35,000	12 May 2007
40,000	30 August 2007
45,000	23 January 2008
50,000	4 June 2008
55,000	19 October 2008
60,000	21 February 2009
65,000	15 July 2009
70,000	15 December 2009
75,000	18 May 2010
80,000	30 November 2010
85,000	1 June 2011
90,000	12 November 2011
95,000	30 March 2012
100,000	25 August 2012
105,000	6 January 2013
110,000	22 April 2013
115,000	7 September 2013
120,000	23 January 2014
200,000	12 August 2019
250,000	1 January 2025

== Local community ==
The first meeting for local Wikipedians was held in 2007.

The Estonian Wikimedia chapter named Wikimedia Eesti was founded in 2010 to support Estonian Wikipedia.

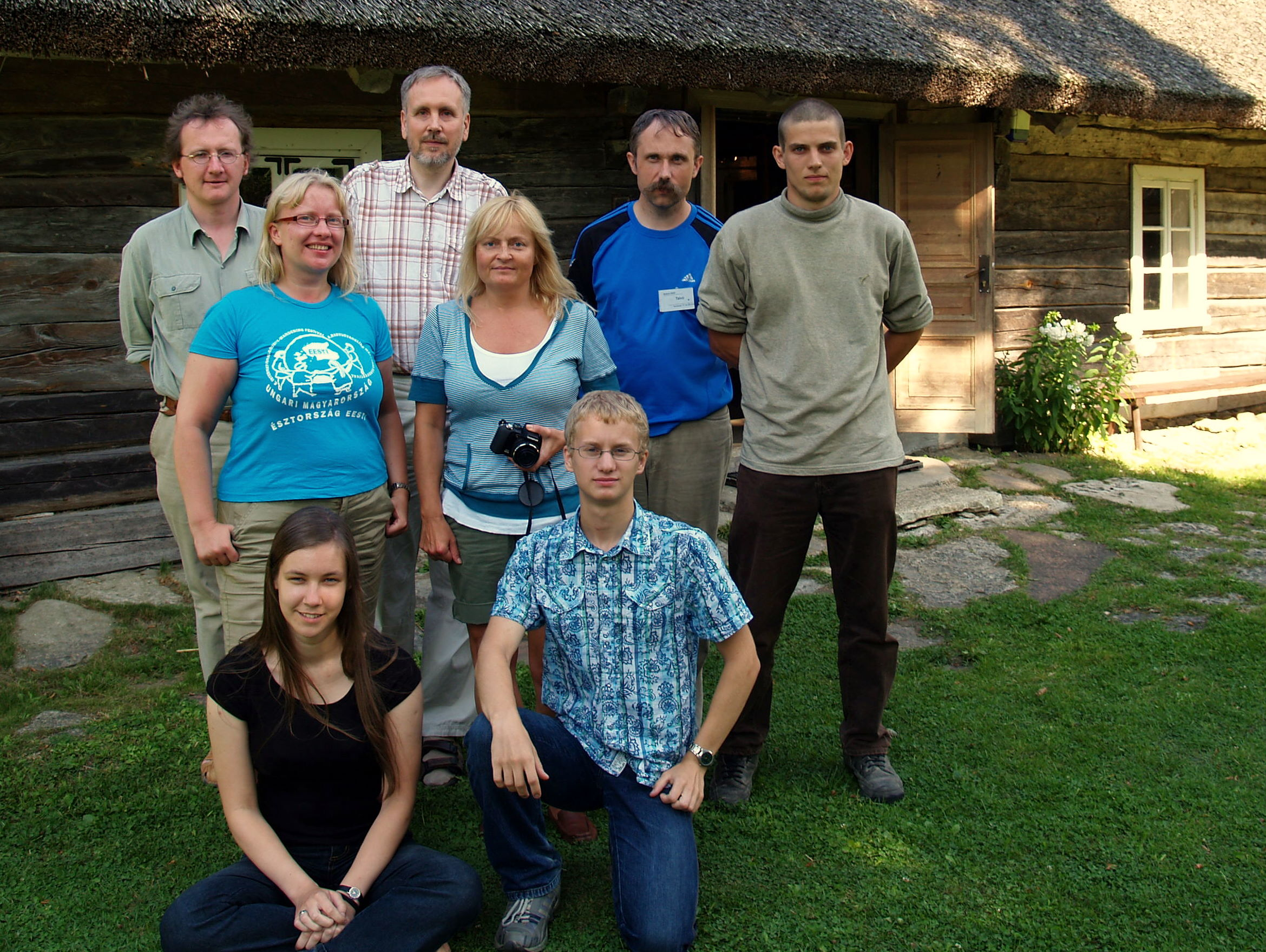
First summer meetup for Estonian Wikipedians (Viki village, 2009)

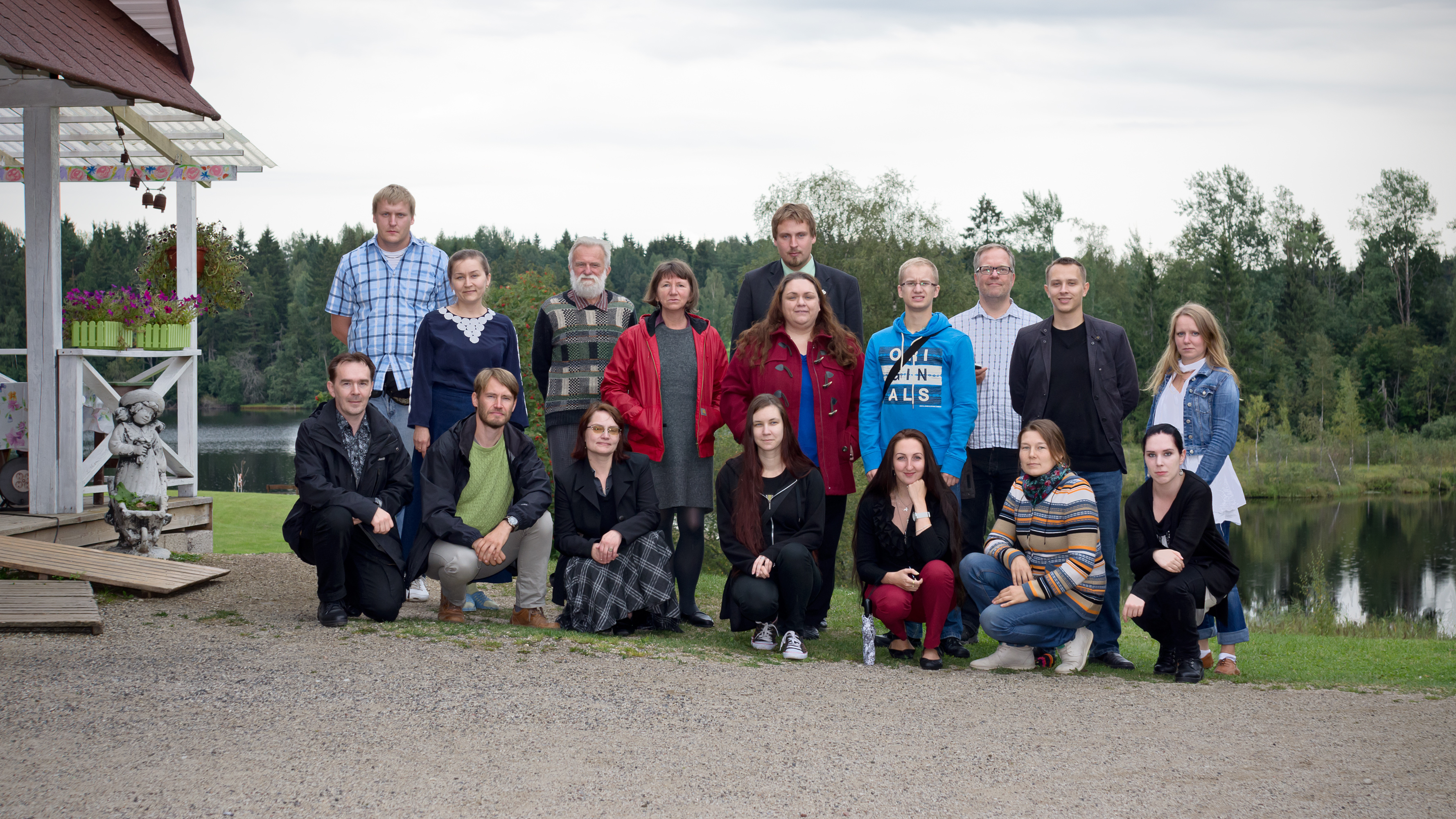
First Finno-ugric wikiseminar in 2014

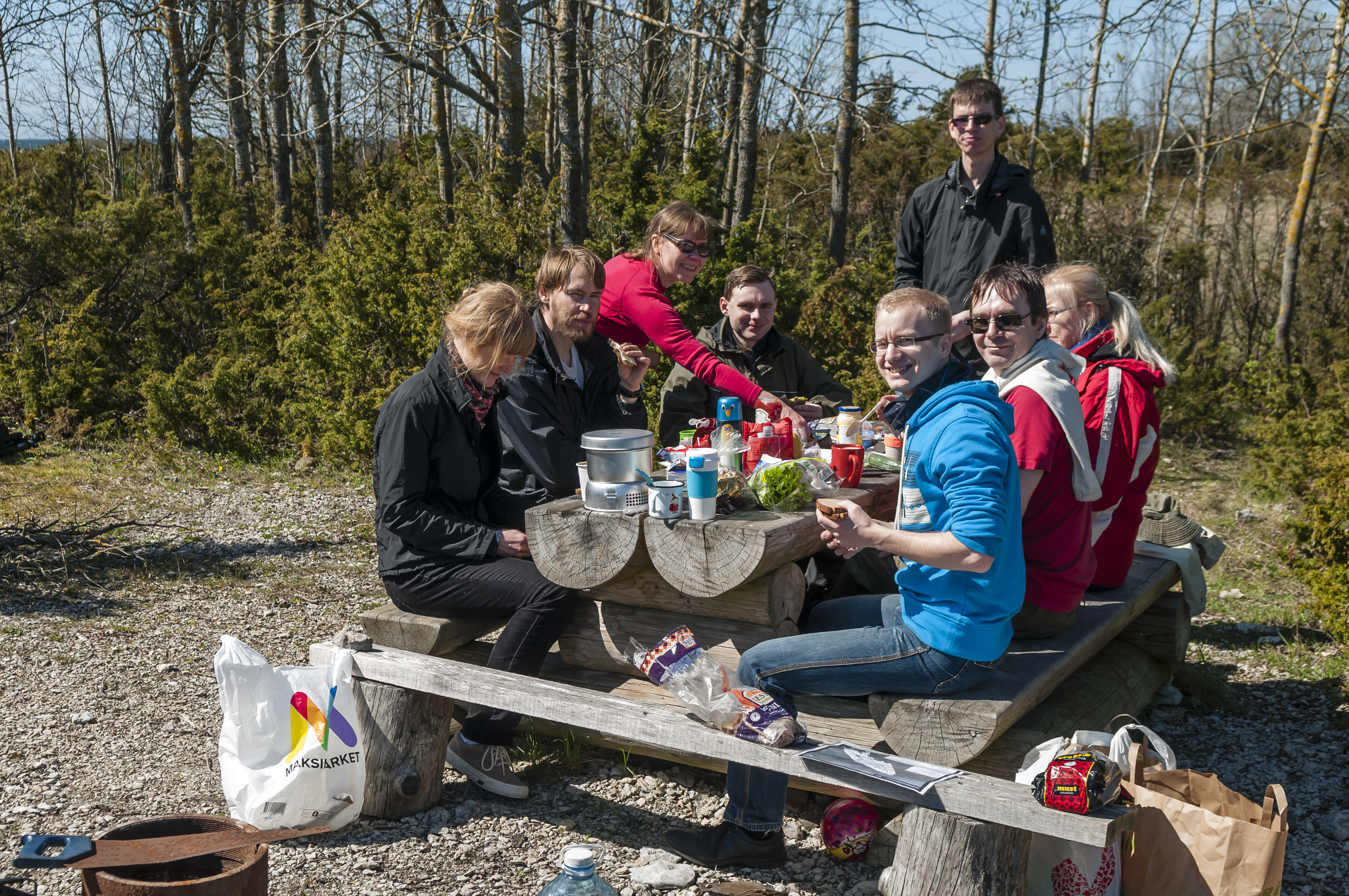
Photomeetup in Osmussaar, 2015

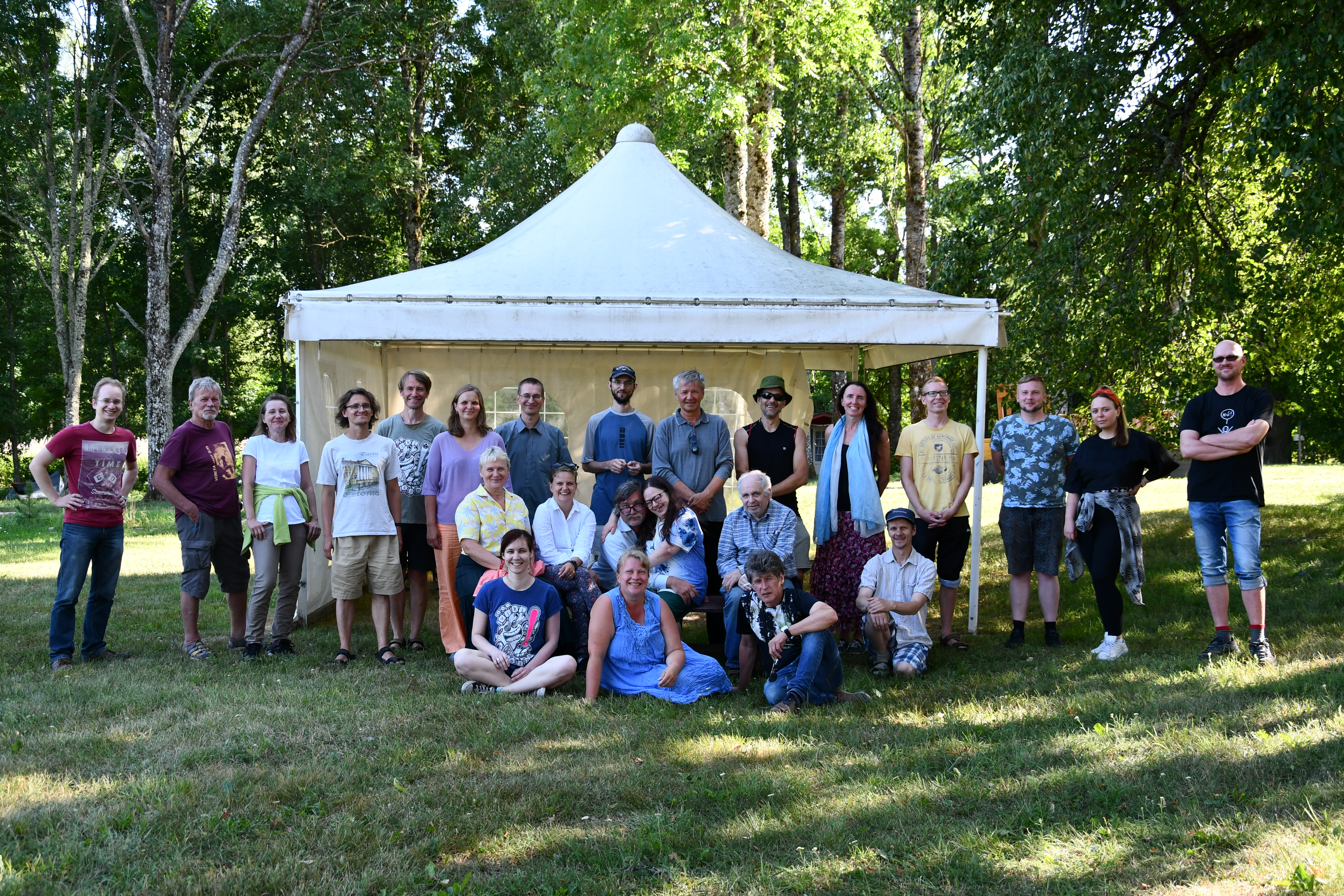
Estonian Wikipedia summer days 2021

== See also ==
- Võro Wikipedia
