= Let's Do It Again =

Let's Do It Again may refer to:

== Film and television ==
- Let's Do It Again (1953 film), an American musical directed by Alexander Hall
- Let's Do It Again (1975 film), an American crime comedy directed by Sidney Poitier
- "Let's Do It Again" (The L Word: Generation Q), a 2019 TV episode

== Music ==
=== Albums ===
- Let's Do It Again (Camp Lo album) or the title song, 2002
- Let's Do It Again (Leela James album), 2009
- Let's Do It Again (soundtrack) or the title song (see below), from the 1975 film

=== Songs ===
- "Let's Do It Again" (song), by the Staple Singers from the 1975 film and album
- "Let's Do It Again", by J Boog, 2011
- "Let's Do It Again", by Jamie xx, 2022
- "Let's Do It Again", by Scooter from Open Your Mind and Your Trousers, 2024
- "Let's Do It Again", by TLC from CrazySexyCool, 1994
- "Let's Do It Again", by Wu-Tang Clan and Mathematics from Black Samson, the Bastard Swordsman, 2025

== See also ==
- Let's Do It (disambiguation)
