= Let's Do It 2008 =

Cleanup day

Volunteers in a cleanup campaign are collecting trash

Let's do it 2008 (Estonian: Teeme ära 2008) was a large campaign on 3 May 2008, to activate civic society in Estonia in an effort to cleanup the country from litter. It was organized by Let's Do It! World.

== Preparation ==
The litter pickup spots were marked by volunteers beforehand who used mobile phones to record the locations to a mapping system similar to Google maps. 10656 locations were recorded in total. Cultural figures, such as Jaan Tätte and Jarek Kasar, helped promote the campaign by participating in televised advertisements. Over 500 partners helped during the cleanup organization process. Volunteers registering to the cleanup were asked to form 3-15 member teams, with each team receiving instructions before the cleanup day via e-mail.

== Cleanup ==
Over 50000 people, or approximately 4% of the population of 1.3 million, participated in the cleanup of the forests and countryside. More than 10000 tons of garbage were removed from the country's forest in about 5 hours for less than 500000 euros. Under normal circumstances it would have taken the government 3 years and 22.5 million euros to accomplish a similar feat.

The organization team consisted of Rainer Nõlvak, Toomas Trapido, Kadri Allikmäe, Henri Laupmaa, Ahti Heinla, Eva Truuverk, Tiina Urm, Anneli Ohvril and Jüri-Ott Salm.

== Spreading the model ==
Shortly after the event, Latvia organized a similar nation-wide event every year (Latvian: Lielā talka). In September 2008, 40000 volunteers participated. Lithuania and Latvia organized larger scale events in April 2009 with 150000 volunteers. On 17 April 2010 a similar event was organized in Slovenia - Let's Clean Slovenia in One Day! (Očistimo slovenijo v enem dnevu) with 12% of population participating (250000 volunteers). And again in 2012: Let's Clean Slovenia 2012. In 2017, the United States held their first National Cleanup Day and joined with Let's Do It! World.

Worldwide cleanup events eventually led to the international organization Let's Do It! World, and the creation of a unified World Cleanup Day program, and the inaugural World Cleanup Day event in 2018.

== See also ==
- Earth Day
- Greenpeace
- National Cleanup Day
- The Ocean Cleanup
- Let's Do It! World

== News and videos ==
- Youtube video: Country clean-up project "Lets Do It 2008" / Teeme Ära 2008
- Tigerprises: Innovation award goes to Let's do it
- AFP: Software gurus launch cleanup of Estonia
