= Urve Uusberg =

Estonian conductor and psychologist

Urve Uusberg (born Urve Piho; 5 January 1953) is an Estonian conductor and psychologist who founded and conducted the choir studio Riinimanda.

== Life and career ==
Uusberg was born in Tartu. She graduated from the Tallinn Pedagogical Institute with a degree in choir conducting in 1975 and from the Tartu State University with a degree in psychology in 1983. In 2004, she defended her master's degree in psychology at the University of Tartu. She has also trained as a psychotherapist at the Estonian-Danish Gestalt Institute.

In 2008, she was Estonian Volunteer of the Year. In 2019, she joined the Order of the White Star, V class.
