= Orders, decorations, and medals of Slovenia =

Orders, decorations, and medals (Slovene: Odlikovanja Republike Slovenije) are awarded to Slovenian citizens who do great deeds for, or on behalf of, the country.

== Order of Freedom of the Republic of Slovenia ==
The Order of Freedom of the Republic of Slovenia (Slovene: Častni znak svobode Republike Slovenije) is a decoration "for services rendered in the defence of freedom and assertion of the sovereignty of the Republic of Slovenia or only in connection with the said acts related to the gaining of independence." They are the highest civilian award given by the government of Slovenia. A majority of recipients of the Orders of Freedom were directly involved in Slovenia's struggle for independence from Yugoslavia, including the Ten-Day War which established their independence.

There are three degrees in the Order of Freedom:

- The Golden Order of Freedom (Slovene: Zlati častni znak svobode RS) is symbolised with a medal on a necklace. The medal is a gold version of the Order of Freedom medallion, on a blue ribbon necklace with tricolor stripes. The bar pin is also gold.
- The Silver Order of Freedom (Slovene: Srebrni častni znak svobode RS) is symbolised the same way as the Order of Freedom, but the medallion and bar pins are silver.
- The Order of Freedom (Slovene: Častni znak svobode RS) is symbolised by a small crystal medallion with a center medal in the tricolors of the Slovenian flag. Recipients also receive an aluminum bar pin with the Slovenian tricolors in the center.

The Orders of Freedom were established by the Orders of Freedom of the Republic of Slovenia Act in 1992.

== Other orders and medals ==
The other orders and medals (Slovene: Redi in medalje) were established to honor works that advance Slovenia as a nation. With the exception of the highest honor, the Order of Exceptional Merits, they are split into three different categories, with a different medal design for each category: civil field, diplomatic and international field, and military or security field. These decorations were established by the Decorations of the Republic of Slovenia Act, instituted in 2004. Except for the Order of Exceptional Merits each field has a slightly different medal design.

- The Order for Exceptional Merits (Slovene: Red za izredne zasluge) is "for exceptional work and services rendered in advancing the sovereignty, prosperity, renown and progress of Slovenia." It is a white, blue and gold medal with a red dot at the center, suspended from a gold and red ribbon pin. It includes a gold and red bar pin.
- The Golden Order for Merits (Slovene: Zlati red za zasluge) is "for exceptional merits accomplished for Slovenia." Its medal is the same as the Order of Exceptional Merits, but is suspended on a yellow ribbon pin. It includes a yellow bar pin in addition.
- The Silver Order for Merits (Slovene: Srebrni red za zasluge) is "for exceptional work and services rendered in the security, defence and protection of the Republic of Slovenia and for international cooperation in these fields." Its medal is similar to the Golden Order, but has silver backing and a silver center shield, and is suspended from a blue ribbon pin. It includes a blue bar pin.
- The Order for Merits (Slovene: Red za zasluge) is "for services accomplished for the Republic of Slovenia in other fields." Its medal is similar to the Silver Order, but lacks the silver backing.
- The Medal for Merits (Slovene: Medalja za zasluge) is "for especially remarkable achievements and results in the fields marking an important contribution to the development and international standing of the Republic of Slovenia." Its medal is white with a blue backing and silver center shield, suspended on a blue ribbon pin with three horizontal gold stripes. Its bar pin is blue with three vertical gold stripes.
- The Medal for Valour (Slovene: Medalja za hrabrost) is "for personal valour and self-sacrifice in saving human lives and material goods." Its medal and bar pin are similar to the Medal for Merits, but have only two gold stripes. It is the only honor that does not have a provision for being conferred upon foreign nationals or organisations.
- The Medal for Honourable Action (Slovene: Medalja za častna dejanja) is "for exceptional actions worthy of particular distinction." Its medal is the reverse colors of the Medal for Merits/Valour, and the ribbon and bar pin have only one gold stripe.
