= National CleanUp Day =

Day observed annually September in the US

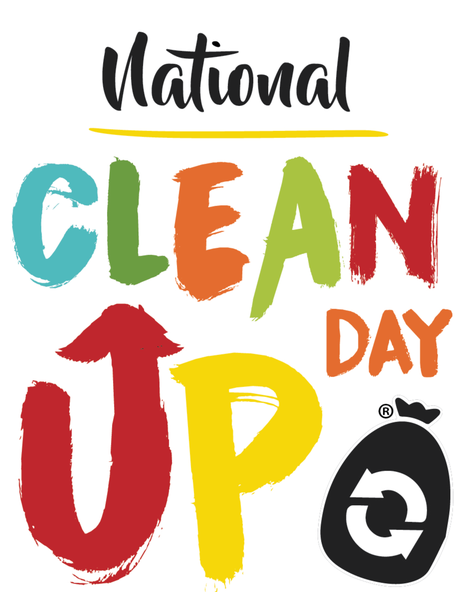
- Type: National
- Celebrations: Volunteer cleanup events
- Date: 3rd Saturday in September
- Frequency: Annual
- Started by: Bill Willoughby and Steve Jewett
- Related to: World Cleanup Day

National Cleanup Day is an annual event in the United States encouraging organized cleanup efforts. It is held on the third Saturday of September. The event is held in conjunction with World Cleanup Day. It is organized by the Non-Profit-Organization Clean Trails, and promotes individual and community volunteer activities to keep outdoor spaces clean and prevent plastic waste from entering the ocean.

== History ==
The first National CleanUp Day was held in 2017 and had more than 225,000 volunteers. In 2018, the event had over 1,500,000 volunteers who collected 14 million pounds of waste. The 2018 event was held in conjunction with the first World Cleanup Day.

The 2019 cleanup received an estimated 20 million volunteers worldwide, including nearly 2 million volunteers in the United States. The corresponding World Cleanup Day received an estimated 20,000,000 volunteers in 170 countries.

In April 2019, Earth Day partnered with National CleanUp Day and Keep America Beautiful for the inaugural Earth Day CleanUp, which had over 500,000 volunteers working to clean up trash and litter nationally. Earth Day and presenting partners, World CleanUp Day, National CleanUp Day, and Keep America Beautiful organized individual activities such as Plogging and the Trash Tag Challenge.
