= Environmental volunteering =

Unpaid work, to help the environment, undertaken freely by individuals as a service

Environmental volunteers conduct a range of activities including environmental monitoring (e.g. wildlife); ecological restoration (e.g. revegetation and weed removal), and educating others about the natural environment. They also participate in community-based projects, improving footpaths, open spaces, and local amenities for the benefit of the local community and visitors. The uptake of environmental volunteering stems in part from the benefits for the volunteers themselves, such as improving social networks and developing a sense of place.

== Types ==
Environmental volunteering can take many forms:

1. Practical: Perhaps most well known are practical forms of environmental volunteering. Volunteers may be involved in habitat management, vegetation cutting, removal of invasive species, etc.
2. Fundraising: Many environmental organizations rely on donations for financial support. Volunteers may be involved in the raising of funds on the ground.
3. Administrative: Volunteers with professional skills, such as legal or PR knowledge, may volunteer by providing administrative support.
4. Advocation: Volunteers can help with lobbying efforts, which can include local, national and international authorities and corporations.

== Motivation ==
Like other types of volunteering, environmental volunteers are motivated by a range of different factors, some of which are altruistic and others are for personal interest and development. The principal motivation behind participating in environmental volunteering is to improve the environment. Surveys have found that those engaged in environmental volunteering care deeply about the environment and wish to improve the environment in which they live within. Recognised motivations are:

1. Making a contribution to the community
2. Promoting social interaction
3. Personal development. Volunteering can help employment prospects. Employers frequently cite volunteering as enhancing job applications. A variety of studies have found that the personal health of those engaged in volunteer work improves. In particular, volunteering improves personal mental well-being. Environmental volunteering enhances community cohesion and improves society. This was notably recognised in the UK and the promotion of the 'Big Society' concept of the David Cameron government.
4. Learning about the natural environment: volunteering is seen as a method to promote knowledge about the environment.
5. A general ethic of care for the environment.

== Tactics ==
=== Internships ===
Internships are typically longer term voluntary placements, aimed at graduates wishing to gain the experience required to work in the environmental sector. Internships last typically for 3-6 months but can last as long as a year. Interns often work on a specific project, working in a full time manner. Internships are often formalised with contracts and specific job roles.

Internships are seen as method for graduates to gain the required work experience to work in the environmental sector. However, there has been increasing concern about unpaid internships generally. The Taylor Report into working practises advocated the banning of unpaid internships as they were seen as a barrier to those entering professions from low socio-economic backgrounds.

Specific concerns relating to internships in the environmental sector are more based on reducing the number of entry-level posts, and exploitation for menial tasks.

=== Educational outreach and advocacy ===
Educational outreach and advocacy efforts take many forms that often involve increasing public awareness, shaping environmental values, and influencing behavior change. Volunteers might participate by leading nature walks, conducting environmental workshops in schools, or tabling at public events to distribute information about sustainability, conservation, and climate change. Some programs are organized by non-profits or government services, such as the National Park Service's Volunteers-In-Parks program, which trains volunteers to educate park visitors on ecological issues and park stewardship.

== See also ==
- Virtual volunteering
