= Let's Do It! World =

Worldwide cleanup day

Let's Do It World
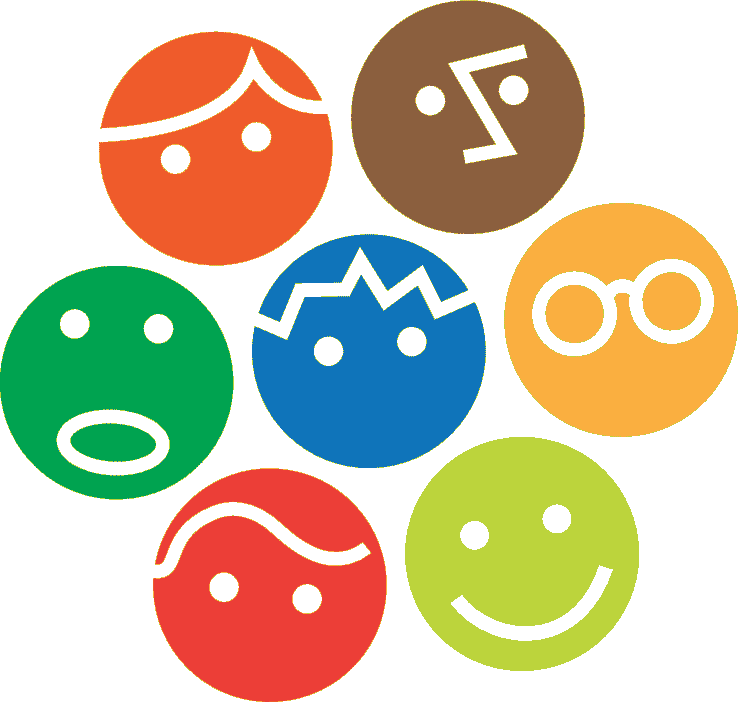
- Type: Non-governmental organization
- Purpose: Environmentalism
- Headquarters: Tallinn, Estonia
- Formerly called: Teeme ära! (2007-2008)

Let's Do It World is a global civic organization that started from Estonia, mobilizing people worldwide in joining local, national and regional clean-up events. Among other projects, it is the founder of World Cleanup Day, on which a network of 180 countries, with over 21.2 million participants took place in 2019. First time in 2024 World Cleanup Day mobilises millions in its first year as a UN International Day.

The Let's Do It! organization was first conceived in Estonia in 2008, where a country clean-up action called Let's do it! (in Estonian: "Teeme ära!") cleaned up 10000 tons of illegal waste by more than 50000 volunteers in one day. Following Estonia's lead, many countries also started their own country clean-up events.

Let's Do It! World is an accredited member of the United Nations Environment Programme (UNEP).

Since 2017, the movement uses the hand gesture W sign, aka "Three Fingers Up," as its symbol.

== History ==
On 3 May 2008, over 50000 Estonians came out of their homes to clean up Estonia in an event called Let's Do It 2008. People at home could follow the process via media channels. The idea spread from Estonia to other parts of Europe and beyond. Next spring, in 2009, Latvia and Lithuania cleaned their countries with more than 250000 people participating and have done it henceforth for three years, engaging more people each year.

On 20 March 2010, Portugal cleaned their country with 200000 people. Slovenia followed shortly, breaking all records with 270000 people (which is 13% of the overall population of the country) taking part in the action. In the beginning of June the same year, Kyiv, the capital of Ukraine was cleaned. By the end of 2011 more than 2.5 million people had participated in Let's Do It! cleanup actions in 16 countries – Estonia, India, Slovenia, Serbia, Finland, Romania, Latvia, Lithuania, Portugal, Bulgaria, Moldova, Ukraine, Cambodia, Russia, Hungary and Brazil.

=== World Cleanup 2012 ===
In 2012, starting from 24 March until 25 September, a series of cleanups happened around the globe, on all continents, bringing together millions of volunteers in 96 countries. The action was initiated on 24 March 2012 by volunteers in Estonia, Slovenia and Portugal. To bring together doers and initiators and share existing experience – Let's Do It! teams were organizing workshops and regional gatherings, introducing the World Cleanup 2012 around the world. Each group or organisation was leading the cleanup action in their country.

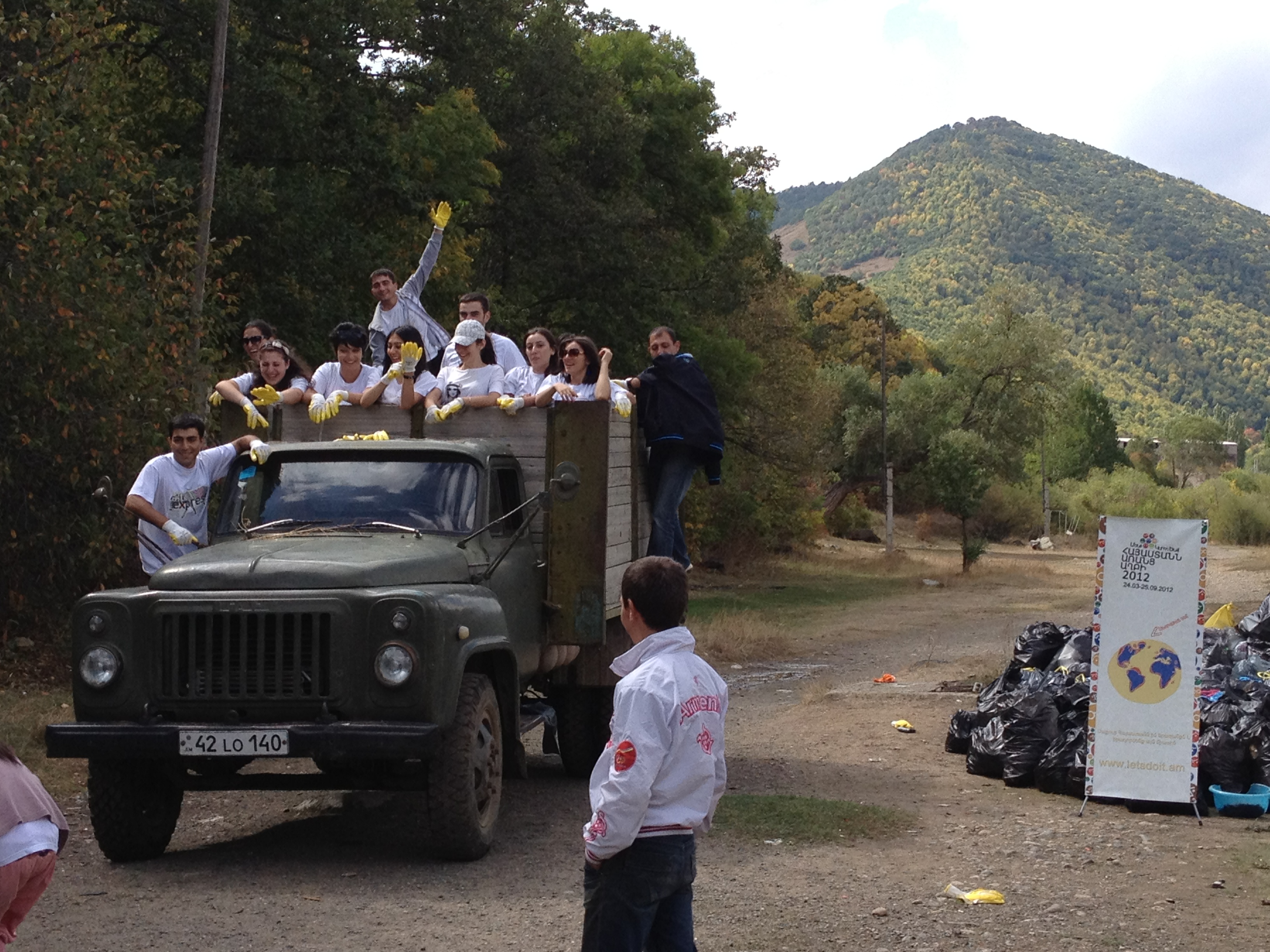
Armenia

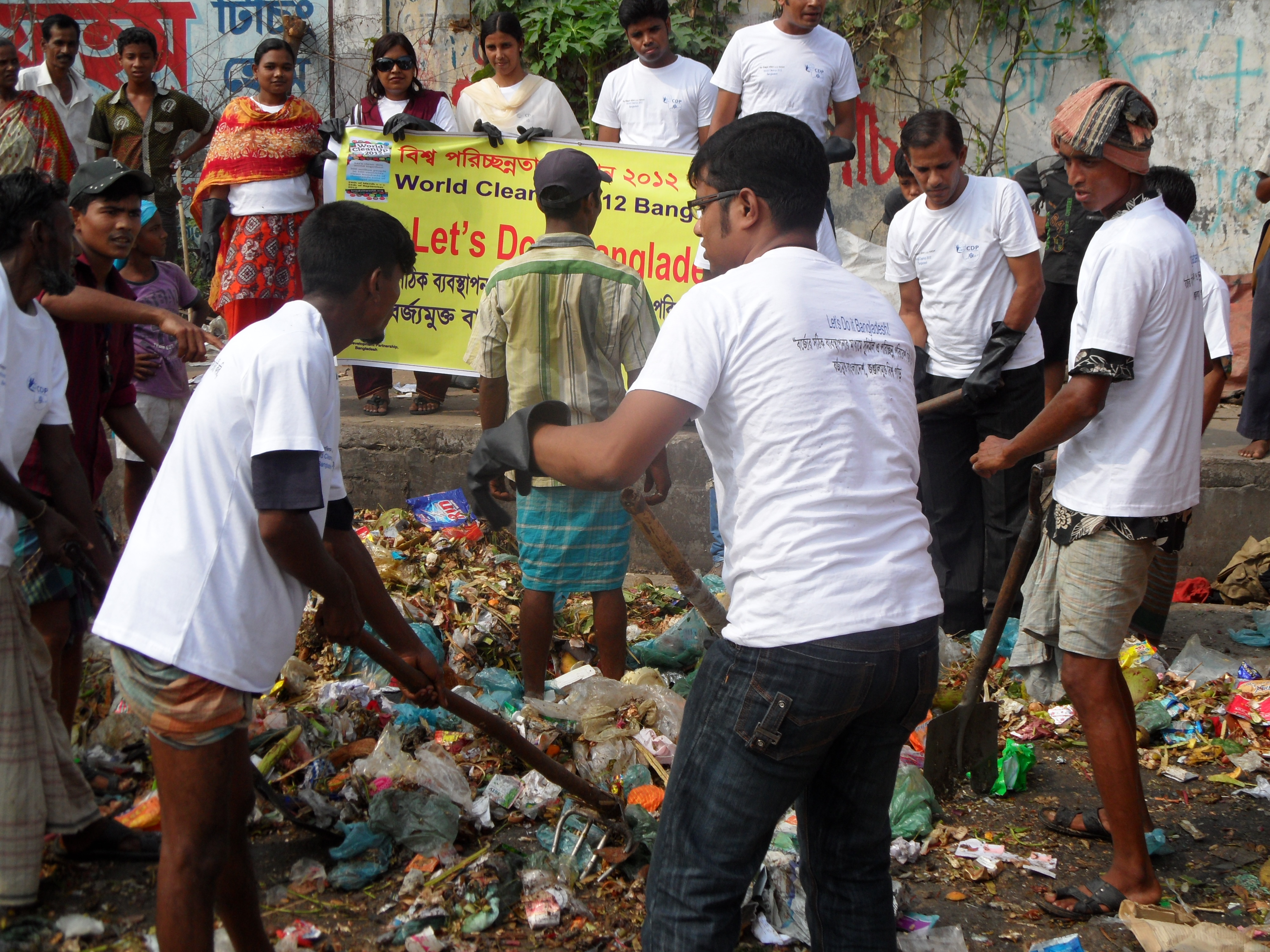
Bangladesh

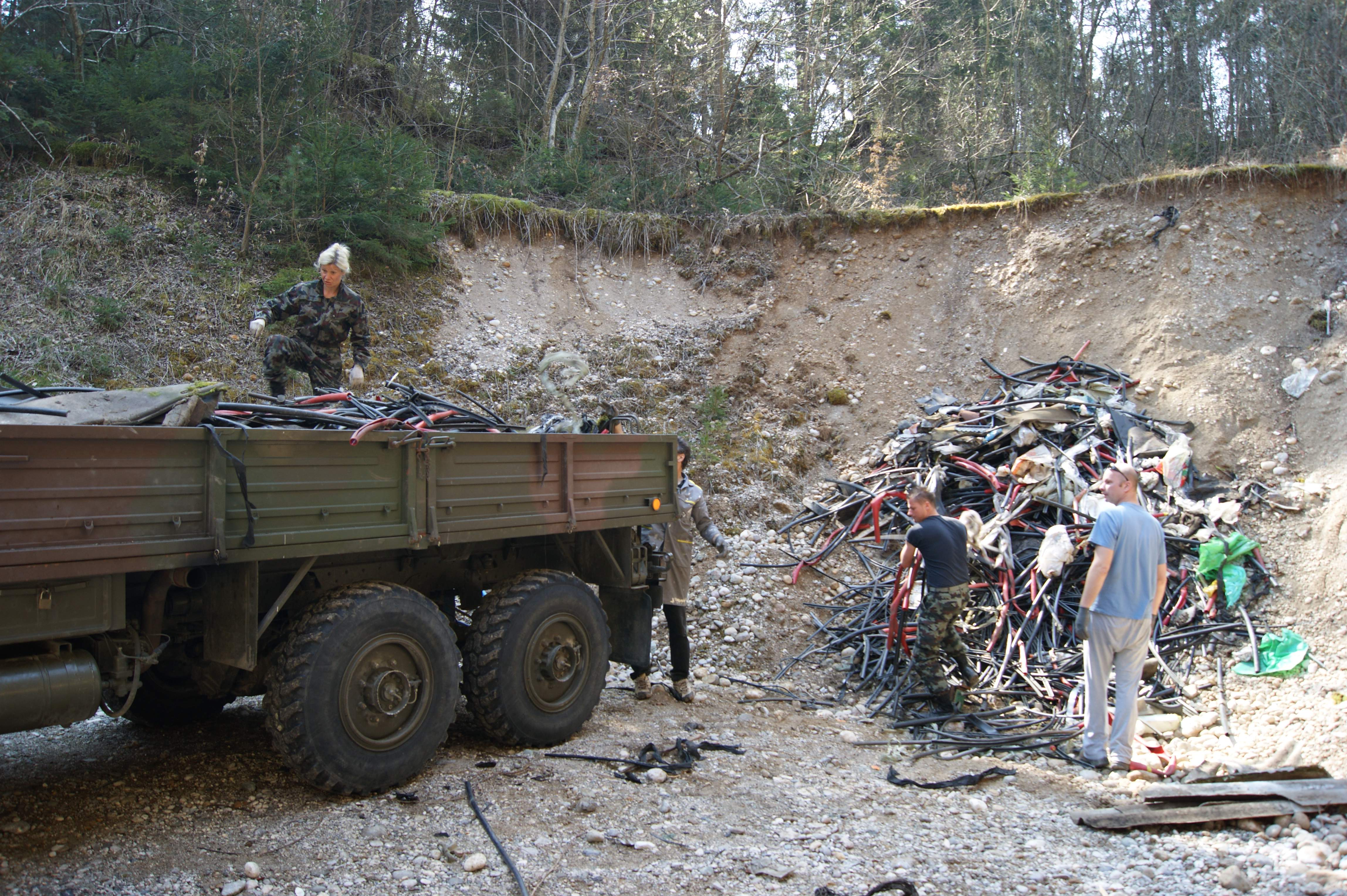
Slovenia

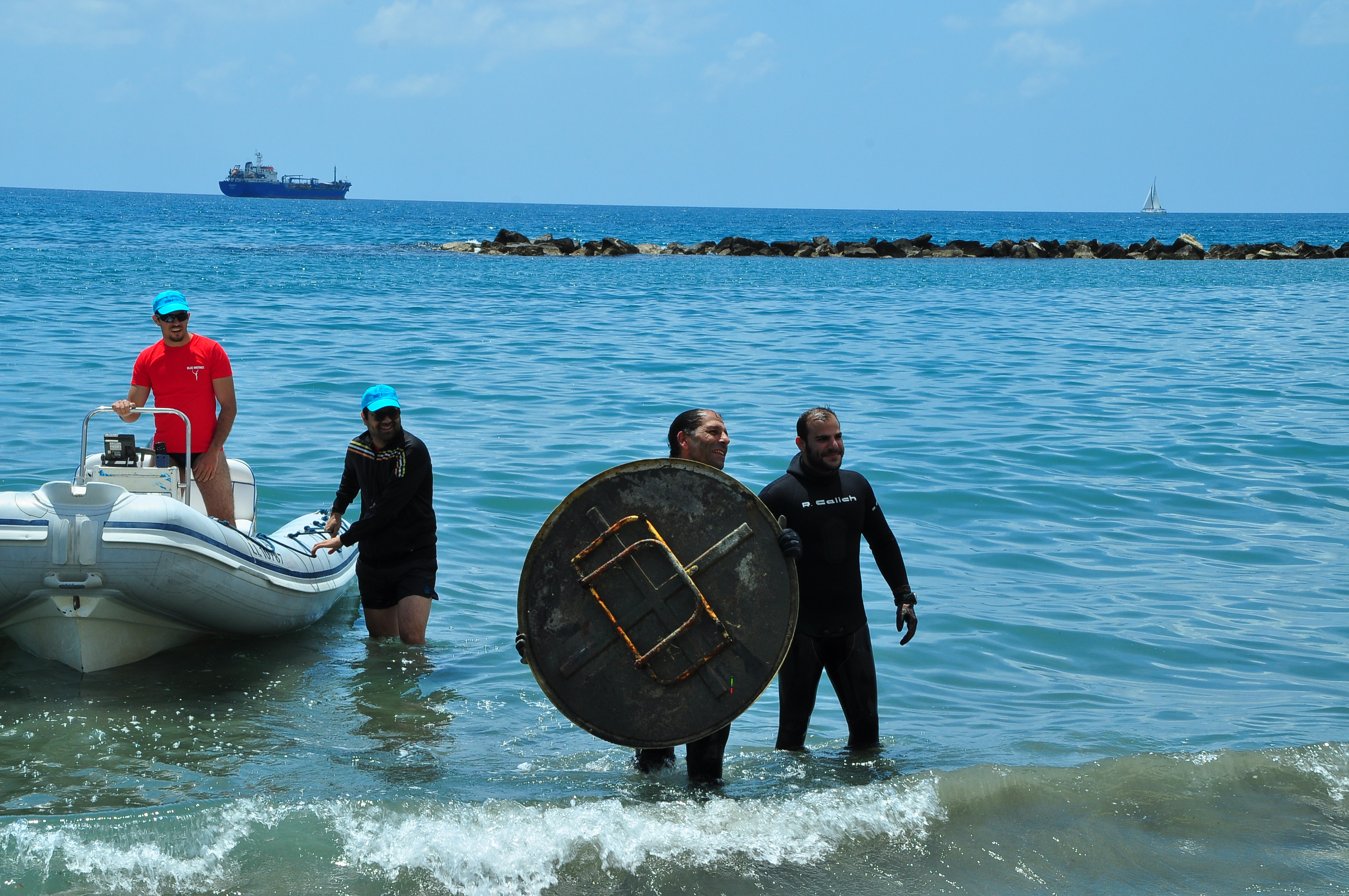
Let's Do It! Mediterranean action in Cyprus, 2014

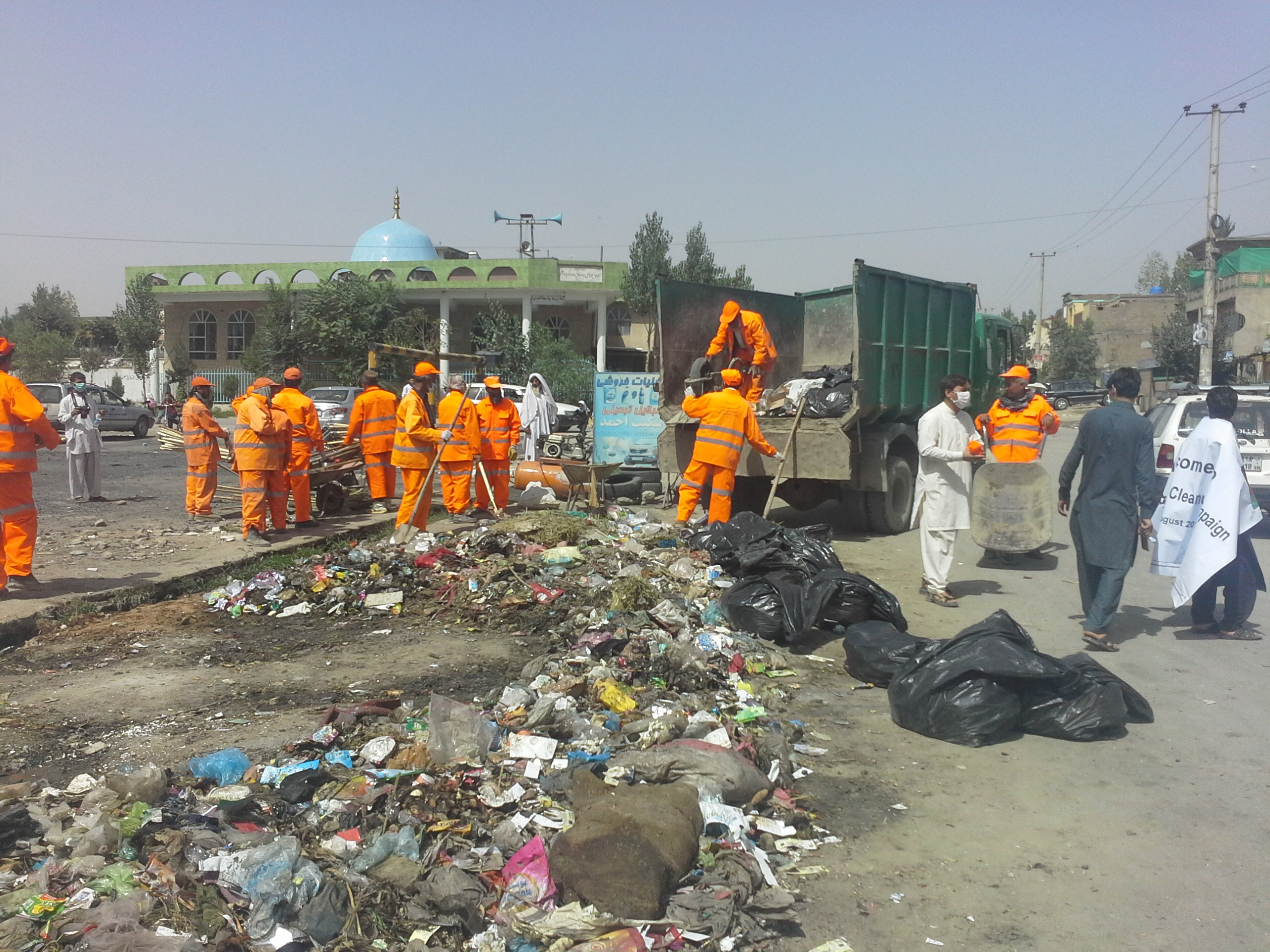
Let's Do It! Afghanistan, 2015

=== World Cleanup Day ===
After a successful World Cleanup 2012 project, the network set more ambitious goals. During the Let's Do It! Clean World Conference held in Pristina, Kosovo on 6–9 February 2014, it was agreed, that the aim of the global movement is to clean up the whole world from illegally dumped solid waste and to keep the planet clean. To reach this goal, the leaders of country cleanups set the ambitious goal to involve 380 million people by 2018. According to Let's Do It! World, this is around 5% of the world's population and is estimated to be the amount to create a lasting change.

This resulted in the first World Cleanup Day on 15 September 2018. Around 18 million people in 157 countries took part in this global cleanup effort. It has been organized annually since then.

== Prize ==
- 2017: European Citizens' Prize
- 2018: The UNESCO-Japan Prize on Education for Sustainable Development

== See also ==
- National Cleanup Day
- Voluntary ecological year
